= Ubuntu version history =

History of the Ubuntu operating system

Ubuntu 26.10 Stonking Stingray

Releases of Ubuntu—a Linux operating system mostly composed of free and open-source software—are made semiannually by Canonical Ltd using the year and month of the release as a version number. The first Ubuntu release, for example, was Ubuntu 4.10 and was released on 20 October 2004. Consequently, version numbers for future versions are provisional; if the release is delayed until a different month (or even year) than planned, the version number will change accordingly.

Releases are scheduled every April and October to incorporate new GNOME releases made every March and September. Free support is offered and includes security updates for "main" free software packaged. Every fourth release, scheduled for April of every even-numbered year, is designated as a long-term support (LTS) release, meaning it receives free support for five years. Non-LTS releases are designed as interim releases and receive free support for nine months. The Expanded Security Maintenance (ESM) service from the Ubuntu Pro subscription, which is free for personal use on up to five devices, extends long-term support to be ten-years long and include security updates for community-managed "universe" free software packages. The Legacy subscription add-on extends long-term support to fifteen years.

On 19 March 2013, the Ubuntu Technical Board reduced the support period for interim releases from eighteen months to nine. For LTS releases 10.04 and earlier, the desktop version received free support for three years, and the server version for five years. LTS release 12.04 harmonized the support period to five years and introduced the Extended Security Maintenance service as part of the Ubuntu Advantage subscription service. By 26 January 2023, Ubuntu Advantage was rebranded to Ubuntu Pro, and ESM to Expanded Security Maintenance as support for the Universe repository was added to the service. The paid Legacy Support was introduced on 25 March 2024, extending long-term support by two years, which increased to five years on 13 November 2025.

== Version end-of-life ==
After each version of Ubuntu has reached its end-of-life time, its repositories are removed from the main Ubuntu servers and consequently the mirrors. Older versions of Ubuntu repositories and releases can be found on the old Ubuntu releases website.

== Naming convention ==
Ubuntu releases are also given code names, using an adjective and an animal with the same first letter – an alliteration – e.g., "Dapper Drake". With the exception of the first two releases, code names are in alphabetical order, and except for the first three releases, the first letters are sequential, allowing a quick determination of which release is newer. As of Ubuntu 17.10, the initial letter "rolled over" and returned to "A". Names are occasionally chosen so that animal appearance or habits reflects some new feature, e.g., "Koala's favourite leaf is Eucalyptus"; see § Ubuntu 9.10 (Karmic Koala). Ubuntu releases are often referred to using only the adjective portion of the code name, e.g., "Feisty".

== Release history ==
=== Ubuntu 4.10 (Warty Warthog) ===
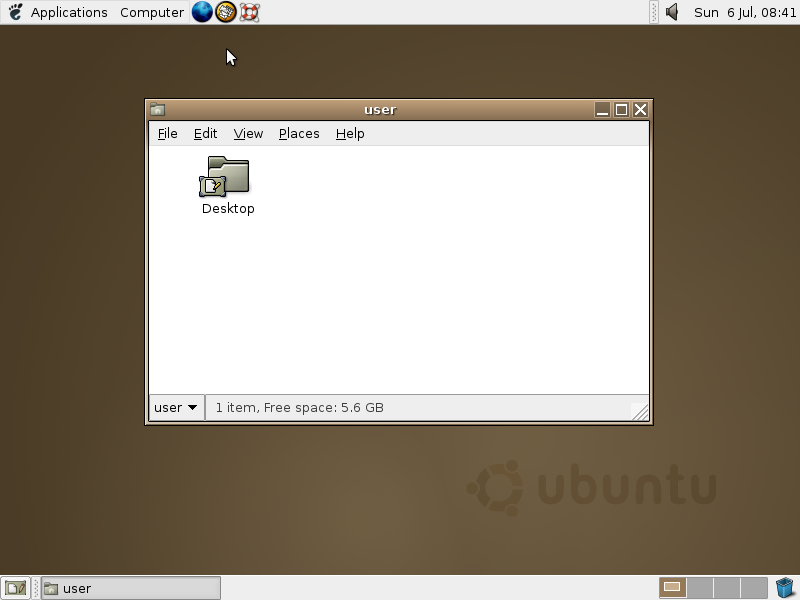
Ubuntu 4.10 (Warty Warthog)

Ubuntu 4.10 (Warty Warthog) was released on 20 October 2004 as the inaugural release of Ubuntu. It received support until 30 April 2006. It is built upon Debian, with plans for a new release every six months and eighteen months of support thereafter. It used the ext3 file system. Ubuntu 4.10 was offered as a free download and, through Canonical's ShipIt service, was also mailed to users free of charge in CD format.

Similar to UserLinux and unlike other distros at the time—which had the user choose the apps to install—the Debian-based Ubuntu curated "one best FOSS app" for each category, minimizing the amount of questions asked by the installer and the disk space used. Alternatives and additional software could be installed through Debian's Advanced Package Tool (APT), which featured automatic dependency resolution, a feature then only found in commercial and professional Linux distributions. Ubuntu's competitors in the consumer-friendly free-of-charge distributions segment required the user to work out such dependencies themselves and did not use the APT dependency resolution tools due to Debian's notorious complexities and hard installation process, which Ubuntu managed to simplify.

=== Ubuntu 5.04 (Hoary Hedgehog) ===
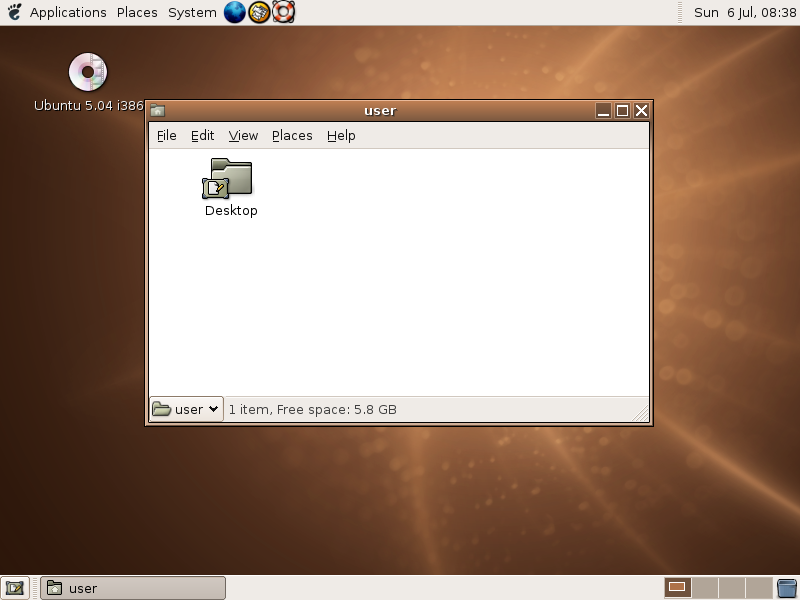
Ubuntu 5.04 (Hoary Hedgehog)

Ubuntu 5.04 (Hoary Hedgehog) was released on 8 April 2005. It received support until 31 October 2006. Ubuntu 5.04 added various new features and packages including installation from USB devices, the Update Manager, an upgrade notifier, readahead, grepmap, suspend, hibernating and standby support, dynamic frequency scaling for processors, the Ubuntu hardware database, Kickstart installation, and APT authentication. Beginning with Ubuntu 5.04, UTF-8 became the default character encoding.

=== Ubuntu 5.10 (Breezy Badger) ===
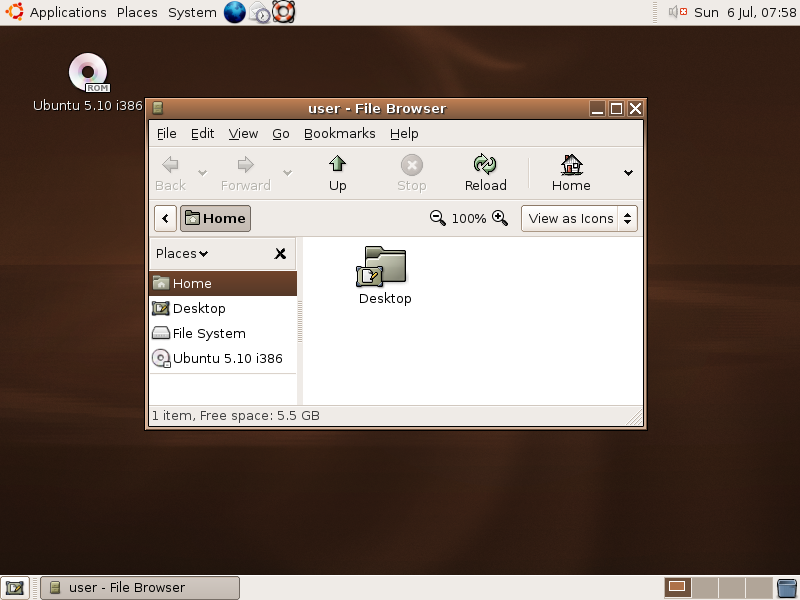
Ubuntu 5.10 (Breezy Badger)

Ubuntu 5.10 (Breezy Badger), released on 12 October 2005 and was supported until 13 April 2007. Ubuntu 5.10 added several new features including a graphical bootloader (Usplash), an Add/Remove Applications tool, a menu editor (Alacarte), an easy language selector, logical volume management support, full Hewlett-Packard printer support, OEM installer support, a new Ubuntu logo in the top-left, and Launchpad integration for bug reporting and software development.

=== Ubuntu 6.06 LTS (Dapper Drake) ===
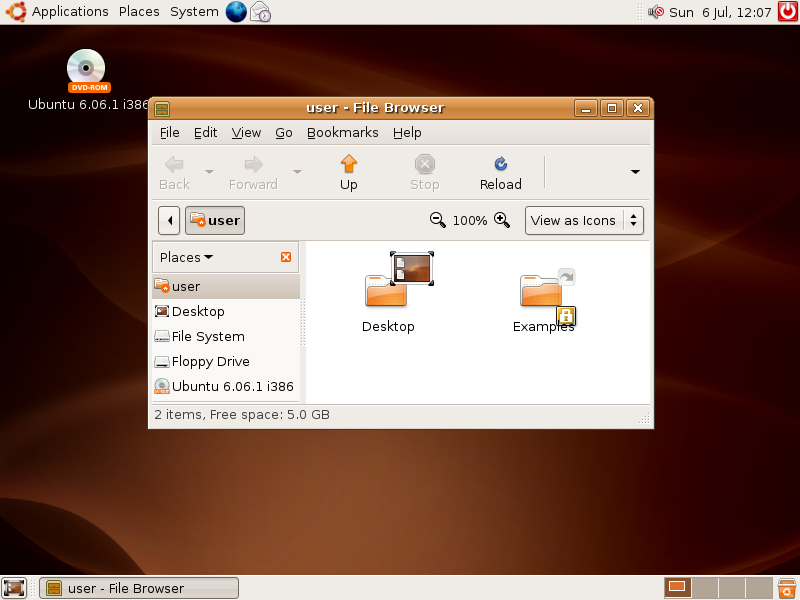
Ubuntu 6.06 (Dapper Drake)

Ubuntu 6.06 (Dapper Drake) released on 1 June 2006 and was the first long-term support (LTS) release, with support continuing until 14 July 2009 for desktops and June 2011 for servers. Ubuntu 6.06 was released behind schedule, having been intended as 6.04. It is sometimes jokingly described as their first "Late To Ship" (LTS) release. Development was not complete in April 2006 and Mark Shuttleworth approved slipping the release date to June, making it 6.06 instead.

Ubuntu 6.06 included several new features, including having the Live CD and Install CD merged onto one disc, a graphical installer on Live CD (Ubiquity), Usplash on shutdown as well as startup, a network manager for easy switching of multiple wired and wireless connections, Humanlooks theme implemented using Tango guidelines, based on Clearlooks and featuring orange colors instead of brown, and GDebi graphical installer for package files. Ubuntu 6.06 did not include a means to install from a USB device, but did for the first time allow installation directly onto removable USB devices.

=== Ubuntu 6.10 (Edgy Eft) ===
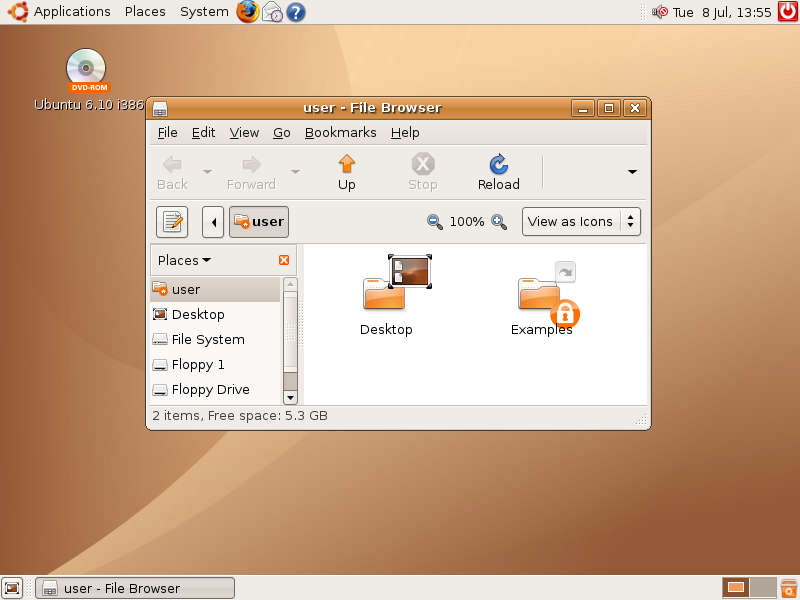
Ubuntu 6.10 (Edgy Eft)

Ubuntu 6.10 (Edgy Eft) released on 26 October 2006 and was supported until 25 April 2008. Ubuntu 6.10 added several new features including a new Human theme, Upstart init daemon, automated crash reports (Apport), Tomboy note taking application, and F-Spot photo manager. EasyUbuntu, a third party program designed to make Ubuntu easier to use, was included in Ubuntu 6.10 as a meta-package.

=== Ubuntu 7.04 (Feisty Fawn) ===
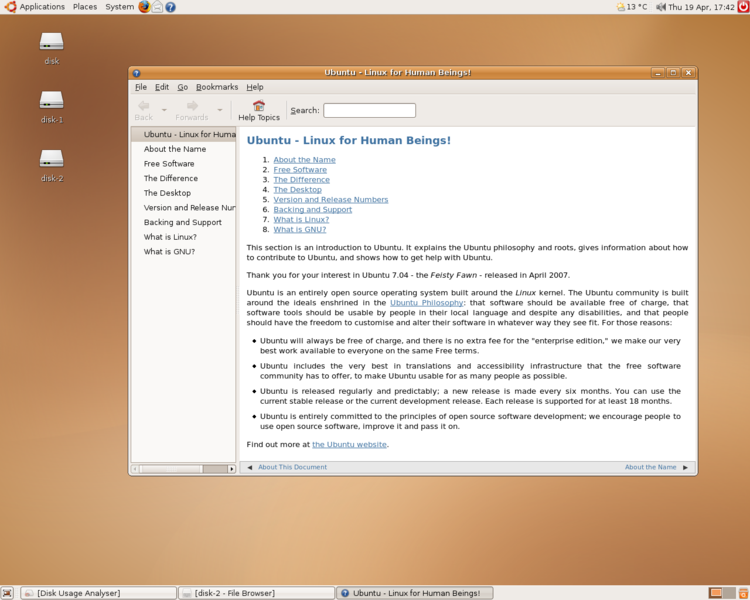
Ubuntu 7.04 (Feisty Fawn)

Ubuntu 7.04 (Feisty Fawn), released on 19 April 2007 and was supported until 19 October 2008. Ubuntu 7.04 included several new features, among them a migration assistant to help former Microsoft Windows users transition to Ubuntu, support for Kernel-based Virtual Machine, assisted codec and restricted drivers installation including Adobe Flash, Java, MP3 support, easier installation of Nvidia and ATI drivers, Compiz desktop effects, support for Wi-Fi Protected Access, the addition of Sudoku and chess, a disk usage analyzer (baobab), GNOME Control Center, and zeroconf support for many devices.

=== Ubuntu 7.10 (Gutsy Gibbon) ===
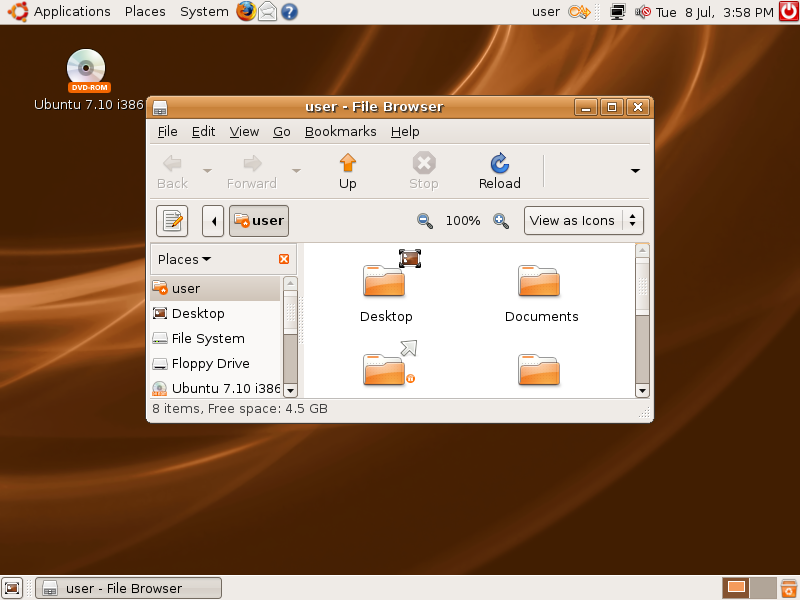
Ubuntu 7.10 (Gutsy Gibbon)

Ubuntu 7.10 (Gutsy Gibbon), released on 18 October 2007 and was supported until 18 April 2009. Ubuntu 7.10 included several new features, among them AppArmor security framework, fast desktop search, a Firefox plug-in manager (Ubufox), a graphical configuration tool for X.Org, full NTFS support (read/write) via NTFS-3G, and a revamped printing system with PDF printing by default. Compiz Fusion was enabled as default in Ubuntu 7.10 and Fast user switching was added.

=== Ubuntu 8.04 LTS (Hardy Heron) ===
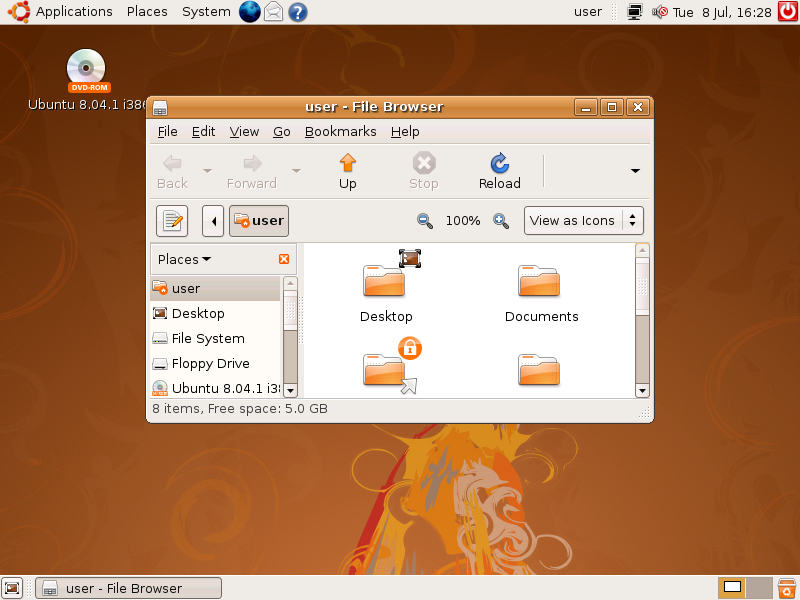
Ubuntu 8.04 (Hardy Heron)

Ubuntu 8.04 (Hardy Heron), released on 24 April 2008 and was the second long-term support release of Ubuntu. Support ended on 12 May 2011 for desktops and ended on 9 May 2013 for servers. Ubuntu 8.04 included several new features, among them Tracker desktop search integration, Brasero for disk burning, Transmission for BitTorrent, Vinagre for Virtual Network Computing, system sound through PulseAudio, and Active Directory authentication and login using Likewise Open. In addition Ubuntu 8.04 included updates for better Tango compliance, various Compiz usability improvements, automatic grabbing and releasing of the mouse cursor when running on a VMware virtual machine, and an easier method to remove Ubuntu. Ubuntu 8.04 was the first version of Ubuntu to include the Wubi installer on the Live CD that allows Ubuntu to be installed as a folder within Windows, without a disk partition. The first version of the Ubuntu Netbook Remix was also introduced.

Ryan Paul of Ars Technica praised the release's Wubi installer, improved hardware detection, and new software, while criticizing the PulseAudio integration's glitches and lack of configuration. Paul also criticized Ubuntu's search integration for disadvantages compared to using Beagle—which he found more feature-complete, supported by bundled software, and comparable to the search experiences of other operating systems.

=== Ubuntu 8.10 (Intrepid Ibex) ===
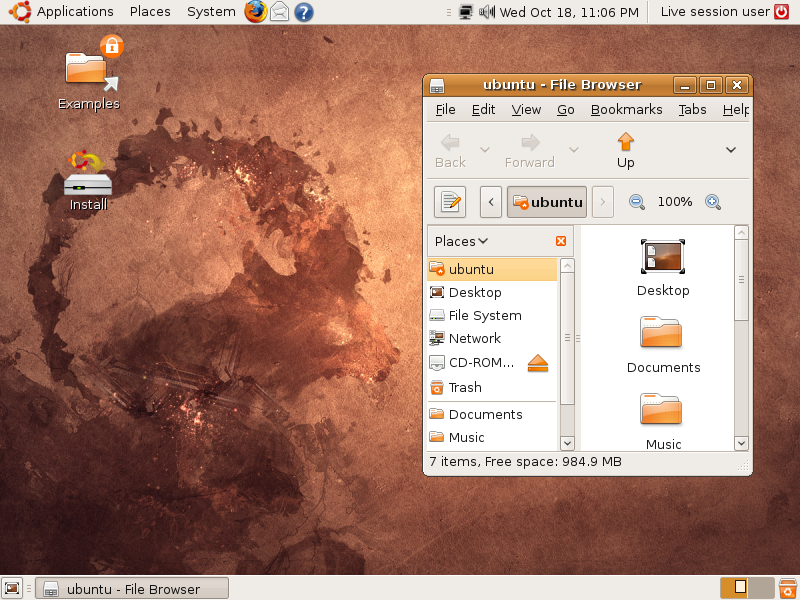
Ubuntu 8.10 (Intrepid Ibex). The default wallpaper depicts an ibex with its large curved horns.

Ubuntu 8.10 (Intrepid Ibex), released on 30 October 2008, and was supported until 30 April 2010. Ubuntu 8.10 introduced several new features including RAID support, improvements to mobile computing, 3G support, and a guest account, which allowed others to use a computer allowing very limited user rights (e.g. accessing the Internet, using software and checking e-mail). Guest files are saved to a temporary folder wiped when logging out. Intrepid Ibex also included an encrypted private directory for users, the inclusion of Dynamic Kernel Module Support, a tool that allows kernel drivers to be automatically rebuilt when new kernels are released, and support for creating USB flash drive images.

=== Ubuntu 9.04 (Jaunty Jackalope) ===
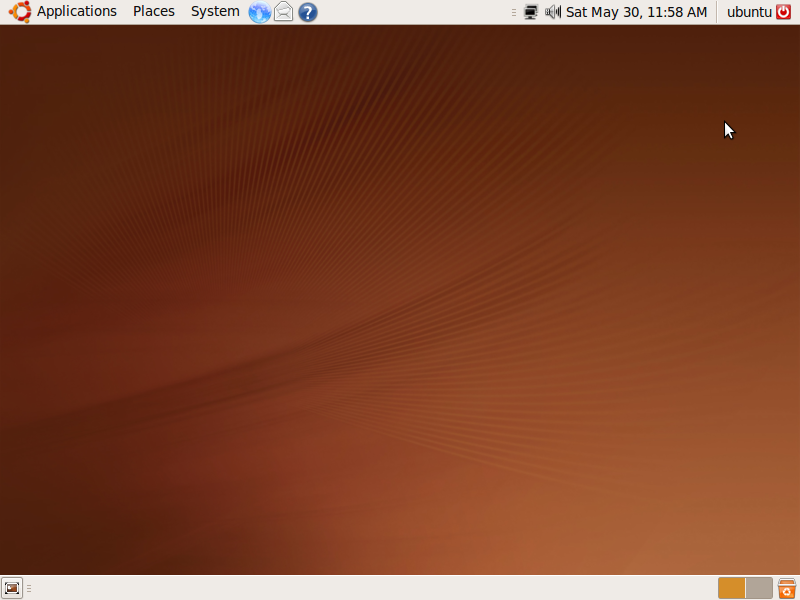
Ubuntu 9.04 (Jaunty Jackalope)

On 24 October 2008, Ubuntu 9.04 (Jaunty Jackalope) was announced by Mark Shuttleworth and was released on 23 April 2009. Support ended on 23 October 2010. New features included faster boot times and the integration of web services and applications into the desktop interface. Because of that, they named it after the mythical jackalope. It was the first release named after a mythical animal, the second being Utopic Unicorn. It had a new usplash screen, a new login screen and also support for both Wacom (hotplugging) and netbooks. It also included a new notification system, Notify OSD, and themes. It marked the first time that all of Ubuntu's core development moved to the GNU Bazaar distributed version control system.

Ubuntu 9.04 was the first version to support the ARM architecture with native support for ARMv5EL and ARMv6EL-VFP.

=== Ubuntu 9.10 (Karmic Koala) ===
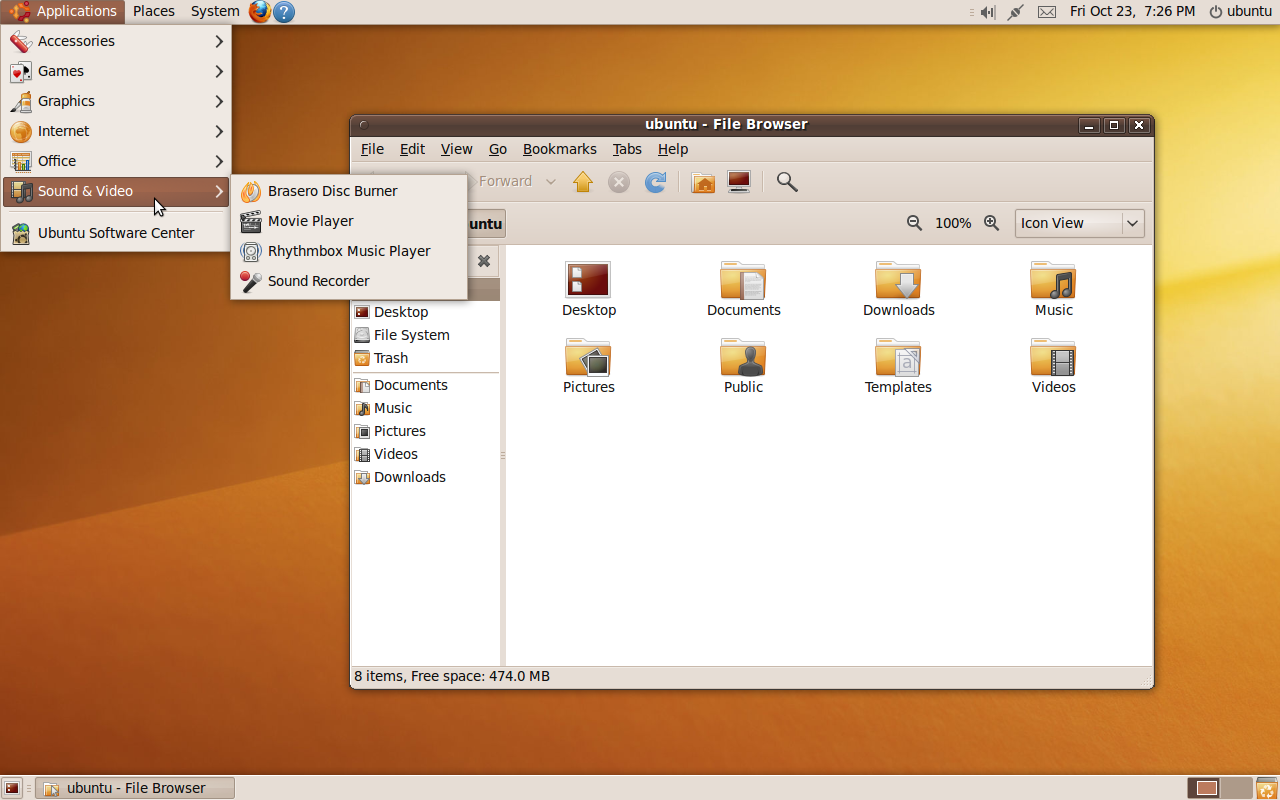
Ubuntu 9.10 (Karmic Koala)

Ubuntu 9.10 (Karmic Koala) was released on 29 October 2009, with support until April 2011. The desktop installation of Ubuntu 9.10 replaced Pidgin with Empathy Instant Messenger as its default instant messaging client. The default filesystem is ext4, and the Ubuntu One client, which interfaces with Canonical's new online storage system, is installed by default. It introduced Grub 2 beta as its default bootloader. It also replaced Add/Remove Programs (gnome-app-install) with Ubuntu Software Center, while Canonical stated their intention to possibly replace Synaptic, Software Sources, Gdebi and Update Manager in Ubuntu 10.04. Karmic Koala also includes a slideshow during the installation process (through ubiquity-slideshow) that highlights applications and features in Ubuntu.

In an announcement to the community on 20 February 2009, Shuttleworth explained that 9.10 would focus on improvements in cloud computing on the server using Eucalyptus, a new theme, as well as further improvements in boot speed and development of the Ubuntu Netbook Remix. The new theme was later delayed to version 10.04, and only minor revisions were made to the default theme. Other graphical improvements included a new set of boot up and shutdown splash screens, a new login screen with a new transition into the desktop and greatly improved performance on Intel graphics chip-sets.

In June 2009, Canonical created the One Hundred Paper Cuts project, focusing developers to fix minor usability issues. A "paper cut" was defined as, "a trivially fixable usability bug that the average user would encounter on his/her first day of using a brand new installation of the latest version of Ubuntu Desktop Edition."

=== Ubuntu 10.04 LTS (Lucid Lynx) ===
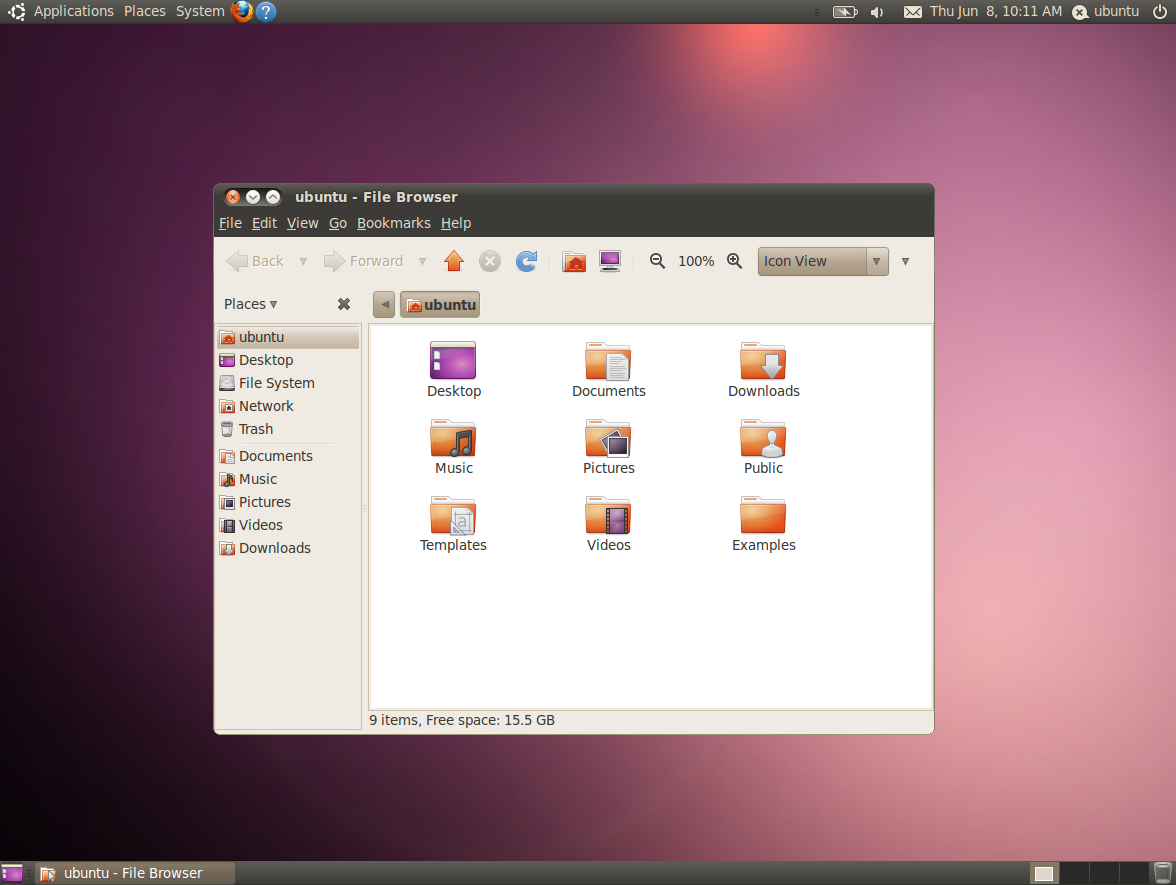
Ubuntu 10.04 (Lucid Lynx)

Shuttleworth first announced Ubuntu 10.04 (Lucid Lynx) on 19 September 2009 at the Atlanta Linux Fest before it was released on 29 April 2010 as Ubuntu's third long-term support (LTS) release. Canonical provided support for the desktop version of Ubuntu 10.04 until 9 May 2013 and for the server version until 30 April 2015. The release included improved support for Nvidia proprietary graphics drivers while switching to the open source Nvidia graphics driver, Nouveau, by default. Plymouth was also introduced, allowing boot animations. It also included a video editor for the first time by including Pitivi. GIMP was replaced with F-Spot due to the former's complexity and file size. The distribution also included integrated interfaces for posting to social media.

On 4 March 2010 it was announced that Lucid Lynx would feature a new theme, including new logos, taking Ubuntu's new visual style into account:

The new style in Ubuntu is inspired by the idea of "Light".

We're drawn to Light, because it denotes both warmth and clarity, and intrigued by the idea that "light" is a good value in software. Good software is "light" in the sense that it uses your resources efficiently, runs quickly, and can easily be reshaped as needed. Ubuntu represents a break with the bloatware of proprietary operating systems and an opportunity to delight to those who use computers for work and play. More and more of our communications are powered by light, and in future, our processing power will depend on our ability to work with light, too.

Visually, light is beautiful, light is ethereal, light brings clarity and comfort.

Historical perspective: From 2004–2010, the theme in Ubuntu was "Human". Our tagline was "Linux for Human Beings" and we used a palette reflective of the full range of humanity. Our focus as a project was bringing Linux from the data center into the lives of our friends and global family.

— Chris Jones, Light: Ubuntu is Lightware, Ubuntu Wiki

The new theme met with mixed critical responses. Ars Technica's Ryan Paul said: "The new themes and updated color palette are nice improvement for Ubuntu ... After testing the new theme for several hours, I feel like it's a step forward, but it still falls a bit short of my expectations." One aspect of controversy from the new design was the placement of the window-control buttons on the left instead of on the right side of the windows. TechSource's Jun Auza expressed concern that the new theme was too close to that used by Apple's Mac OS X: "I think Ubuntu is having an identity crisis right now and should seriously consider changing several things in terms of look and feel to avoid being branded as a Mac OS X rip-off, or worse, get sued by Apple. I believe the fans are divided right now. Some have learned to love the brown color scheme since it uniquely represents Ubuntu, while others wanted change."

=== Ubuntu 10.10 (Maverick Meerkat) ===
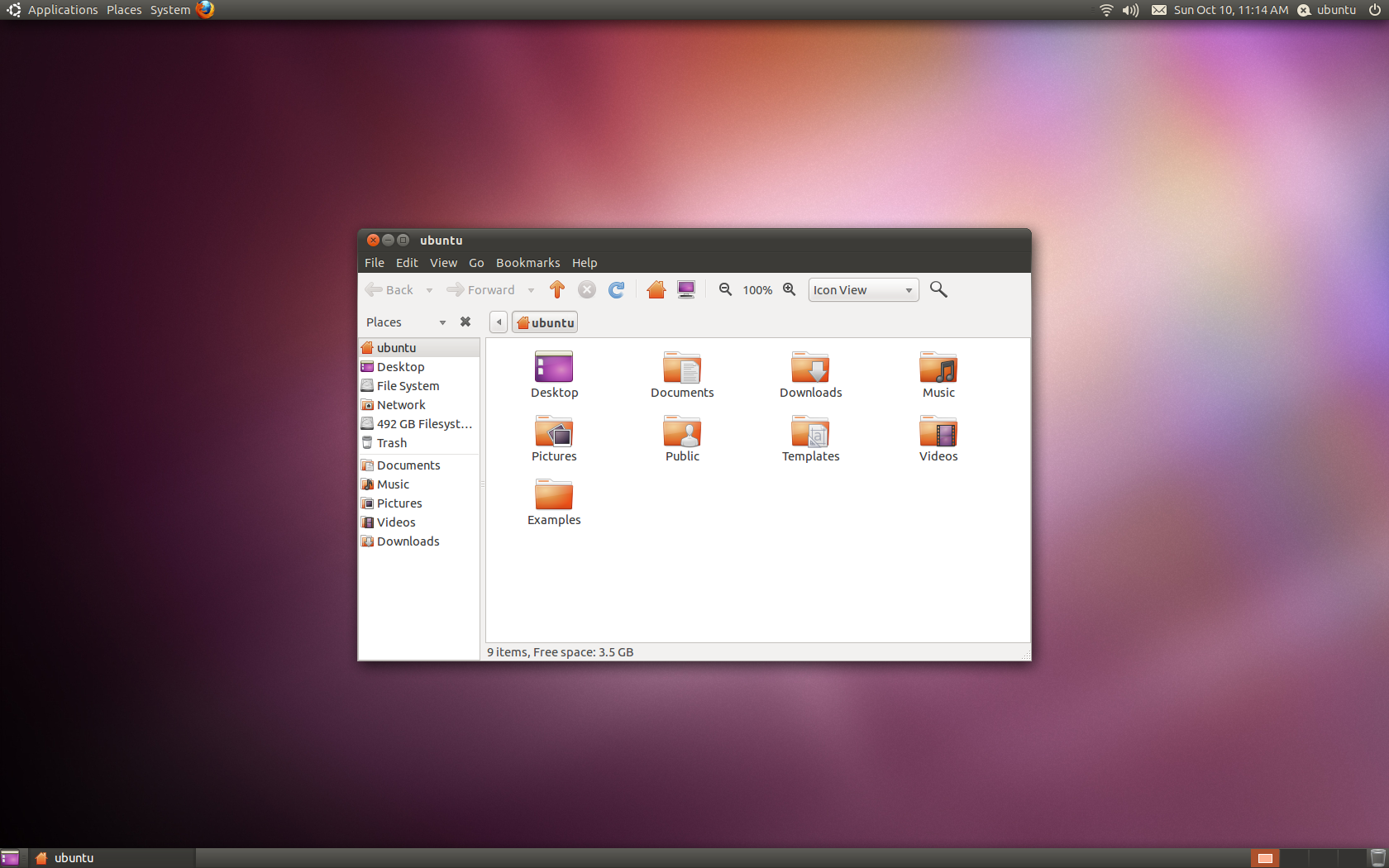
Ubuntu 10.10 (Maverick Meerkat)

The naming of Ubuntu 10.10 (Maverick Meerkat) was announced by Shuttleworth on 2 April 2010, along with the release's goals of improving the netbook experience and a server focus on hybrid cloud computing. Ubuntu 10.10 was released on 10 October 2010 (10.10.10) at 10:10:10 UTC. This was a departure from the traditional schedule of releasing an update at the end of October, and this change was made in order to get "the perfect 10", and a playful reference to The Hitchhiker's Guide to the Galaxy, since, in binary, 101010 is equal to the number 42, the "Answer to the Ultimate Question of Life, the Universe and Everything" within the series. Support ended on 10 April 2012. New features included the new Unity interface for the Netbook Edition, a new default photo manager, Shotwell, replacing F-Spot, the ability to purchase applications in the Software Center, and an official Ubuntu font used by default.

=== Ubuntu 11.04 (Natty Narwhal) ===
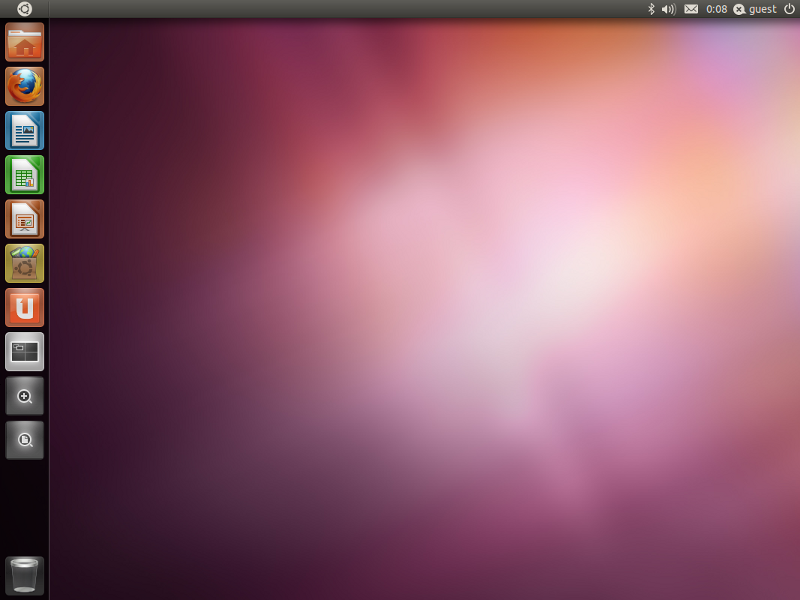
Ubuntu 11.04 Desktop (Natty Narwhal) using Unity

The naming of Ubuntu 11.04 (Natty Narwhal) was announced on 17 August 2010 by Shuttleworth, and was released on 28 April 2011 with support until 28 October 2012. Ubuntu 11.04 used the Unity user interface instead of GNOME 2 as default. The move to Unity was controversial as some GNOME developers feared it would fracture the community and marginalize GNOME Shell. Ubuntu 11.04 employed Banshee as the default music player, replacing Rhythmbox. Other new applications included OpenStack, Firefox 4, and LibreOffice, which replaced OpenOffice.org. The Ubuntu Netbook Edition was merged into the desktop edition. Jesse Smith of DistroWatch criticized the instability of the release.

=== Ubuntu 11.10 (Oneiric Ocelot) ===
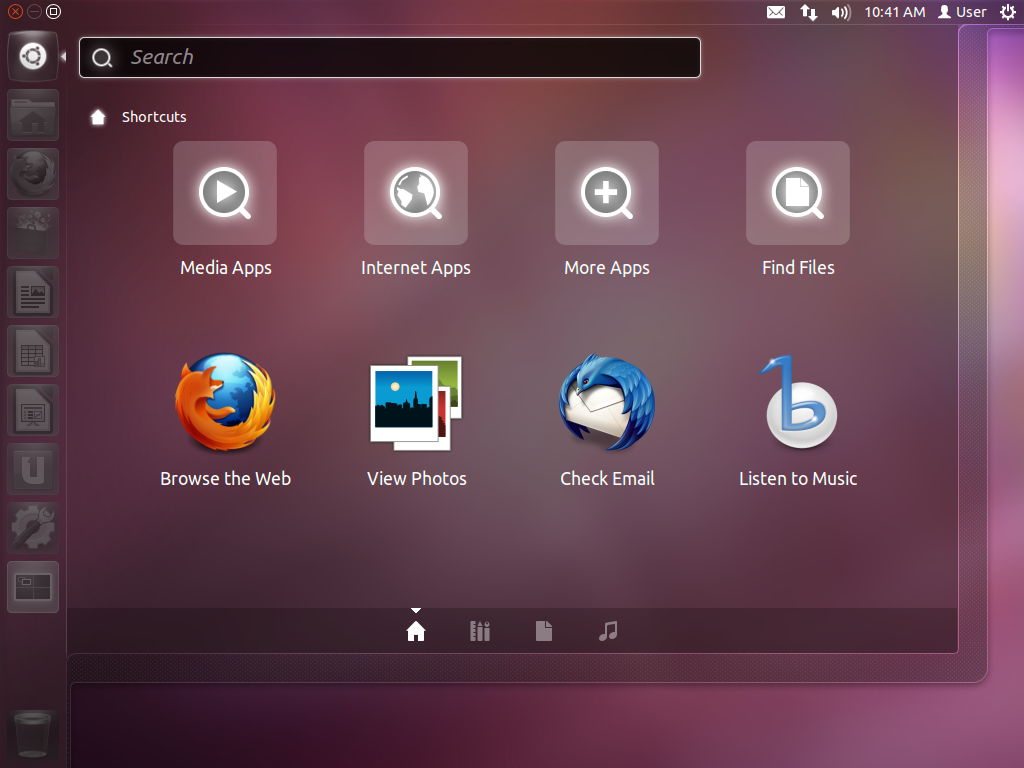
Ubuntu 11.10 final release (13 October 2011) running Unity 4.22.0

The naming of Ubuntu 11.10 (Oneiric Ocelot) was announced on 7 March 2011 by Mark Shuttleworth. He explained that Oneiric means "dreamy". Ubuntu 11.10 was released on 13 October 2011, and was supported until 9 May 2013.

In April 2011, Shuttleworth announced that Ubuntu 11.10 would not include the classic GNOME desktop as a fall back to Unity. Instead, 11.10 included a 2D version of Unity as a fallback for computers that lacked the hardware resources for the Compiz-based 3D version. Shuttleworth also confirmed that Unity in Ubuntu 11.10 would run as a shell for GNOME 3 on top of GNOME 3 libraries, unlike in Ubuntu 11.04 where it ran as a shell for GNOME 2. Meanwhile, users were able to install the entire GNOME 3 stack along with GNOME Shell directly from the Ubuntu repositories. During the development cycle there were many changes to Unity, including the placement of the Ubuntu button on the left Launcher instead of on the top Panel, the autohiding of the window controls (and the global menu) on maximized windows, and the introduction of window controls and more transparency into the Dash search utility.

In May 2011, it was announced that Pitivi would be no longer part of the Ubuntu ISO, starting with Ubuntu 11.10 Oneiric Ocelot. The reasons given for removing it included poor user reception, lack of fit with the default user-case for Ubuntu, lack of polish and the application's lack of development maturity. Other changes included the removal of the Synaptic package manager, and removing Computer Janitor, as it caused broken systems for users. Déjà Dup was added as Ubuntu's backup program. Mozilla Thunderbird replaced the GNOME Evolution email client.

=== Ubuntu 12.04 LTS (Precise Pangolin) ===
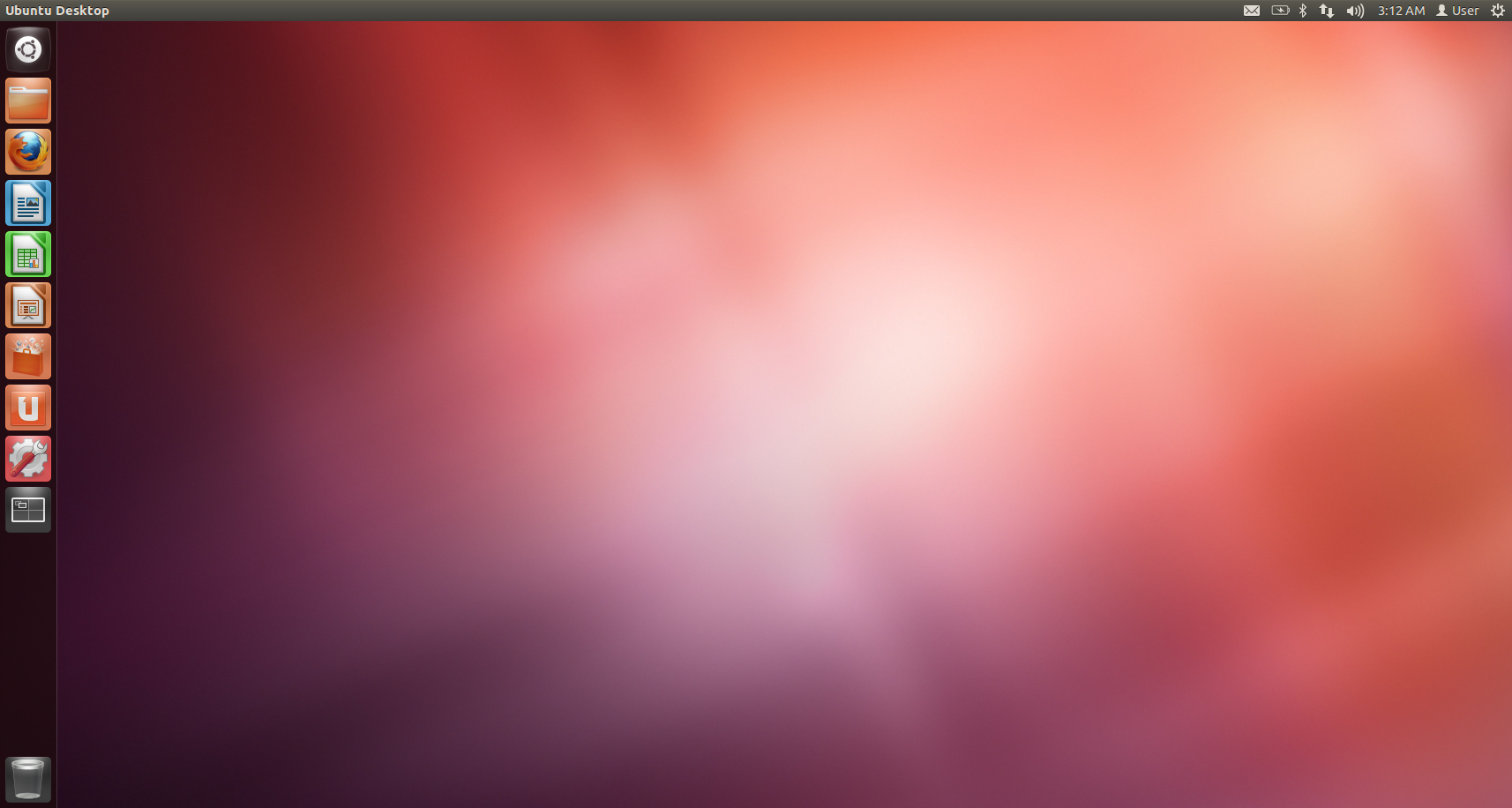
Ubuntu 12.04 LTS desktop

Ubuntu 12.04 LTS (Precise Pangolin) is the fourth long-term support (LTS) version of Ubuntu, released on 26 April 2012. It is named after the pangolin anteater. The support period for the desktop version was increased to five years from three years to match the server version with this release, ending on 28 April 2017. Canonical continued to offer extended security maintenance to Advantage customers for an additional two years.

Changes in this release include cutting the startup time for the Ubuntu Software Center by around 10 seconds, refinements to Unity that included the removal of the "window dodge" feature that made desktop panels hide from windows, and a new head-up display (HUD) feature that allows hot key searching for application menu items from the keyboard, without needing the mouse. Shuttleworth claimed that the HUD will ultimately replace menus in Unity applications. This release also switched the default media player from Banshee back to Rhythmbox and dropped the Tomboy note-taking application along with the supporting Mono framework. It also shipped with IPv6 privacy extensions, a feature introduced in 11.10, turned on by default.

Jesse Smith of DistroWatch reviewed that while many people had questioned Ubuntu's direction, he felt that the "puzzle pieces, which may have been underwhelming individually, have come together to form a whole, clear picture." He wrote that Unity had grown to maturity, was non-traditional but attractive thanks to the HUD feature and reducing mouse travel, while criticizing its lack of flexibility, unsatisfactory performance in a virtual machine, and the HUD not working in many applications like LibreOffice.

=== Ubuntu 12.10 (Quantal Quetzal) ===
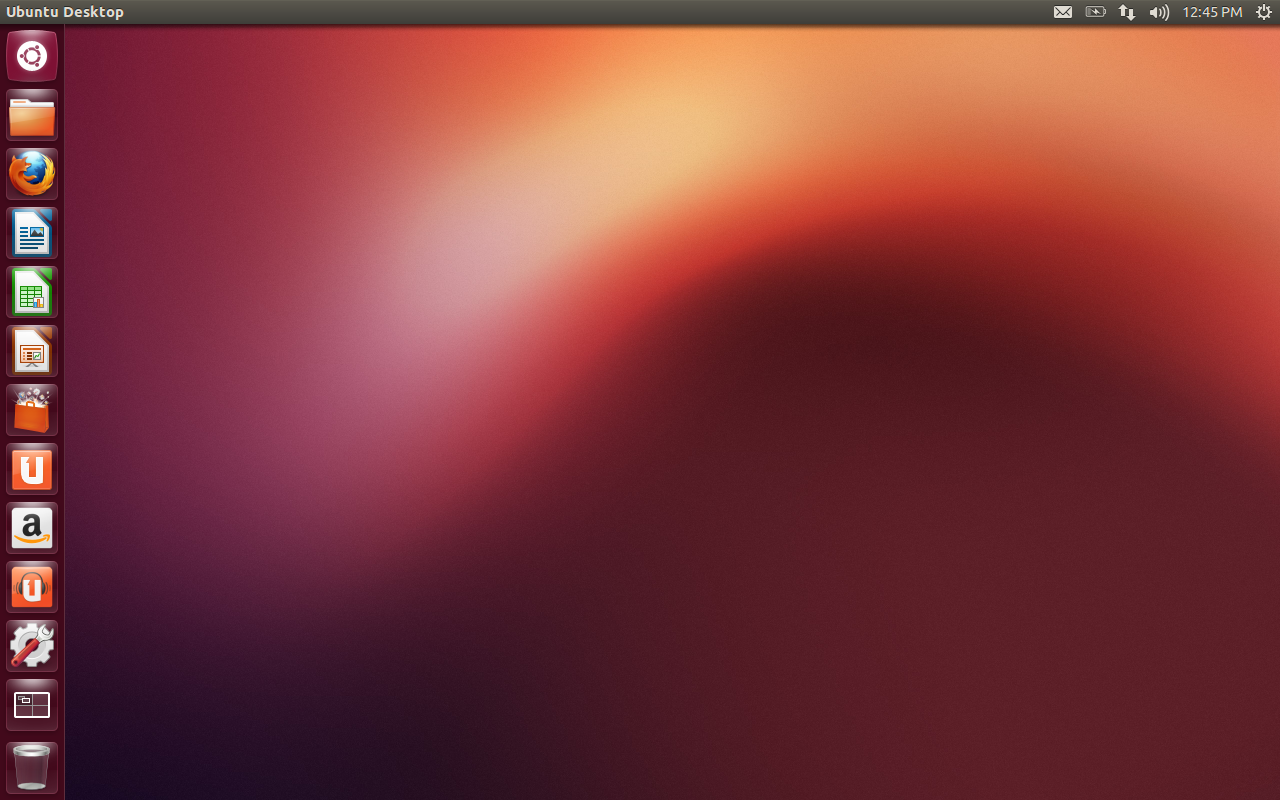
Ubuntu 12.10's default desktop

On 23 April 2012, Shuttleworth announced Ubuntu 12.10 (Quantal Quetzal) as the first of 4 releases that will culminate in LTS 14.04 and refresh the look, with work to be done on typography and iconography. The release takes its name from the quetzal, a species of Central American birds. It was released on 18 October 2012. Support ended on 16 May 2014. The Ubuntu Developer Summit held in May 2012 forecast this release to include an improved boot up sequence and log-in screen, "wrap around" dialogs and toolbars for the head-up display, and a vanilla version of Gnome-Shell as an option while dropping Unity 2D in favor of lower hardware requirements for Unity 3D. It would ship with Python 3 in the image and Python 2 available via the "Python" package, the PAE switched on by default in the kernel, Ubuntu Web Apps, a means of running Web applications directly from the desktop without having to open a browser, Nautilus 3.4 as its file manager to retain features deleted from later versions, and a new combined user, session and system menu.

In September 2012, Canonical's Kate Stewart announced that the Ubuntu 12.10 image would not fit on a compact disc. However, a third-party project has created a version of Ubuntu 12.10 that fits on a CD with LZMA2 compression instead of the DEFLATE compression used on the official Ubuntu DVD image.

In the same month, it was announced that the version of Unity to be shipped with Ubuntu 12.10 would by default include searches from Amazon.com for searched terms. This move caused immediate controversy among Ubuntu users, particularly with regard to privacy issues and European Directive 95/46/EC, and caused Shuttleworth to issue a statement indicating that this feature is not adware and labelled many of the objections as Fear, uncertainty, and doubt. Regardless, users filed a Launchpad bug report on the feature requesting that it be made a separate lens (mode for the search engine) and not included with general desktop searches for files, directories and applications. The degree of community push-back on the issue resulted in plans by the developers to make the dash and where it searches user-configurable via a GUI-setting dialogue. Despite concerns that the setting dialogue would not make the release, it was completed and is present in 12.10.

In reviewing Ubuntu 12.10 at the end of October 2012 for DistroWatch, Jesse Smith raised concerns that "Canonical reserves the right to share our keystrokes, search terms and IP address with a number of third parties", and criticized the low performance and instability of the release. In early November, the Electronic Frontier Foundation criticized how the release loaded products from Amazon through HTTP, subject to eavesdropping. Jim Lynch gave a favorable review in December while noting concerns of software bloat.

=== Ubuntu 13.04 (Raring Ringtail) ===
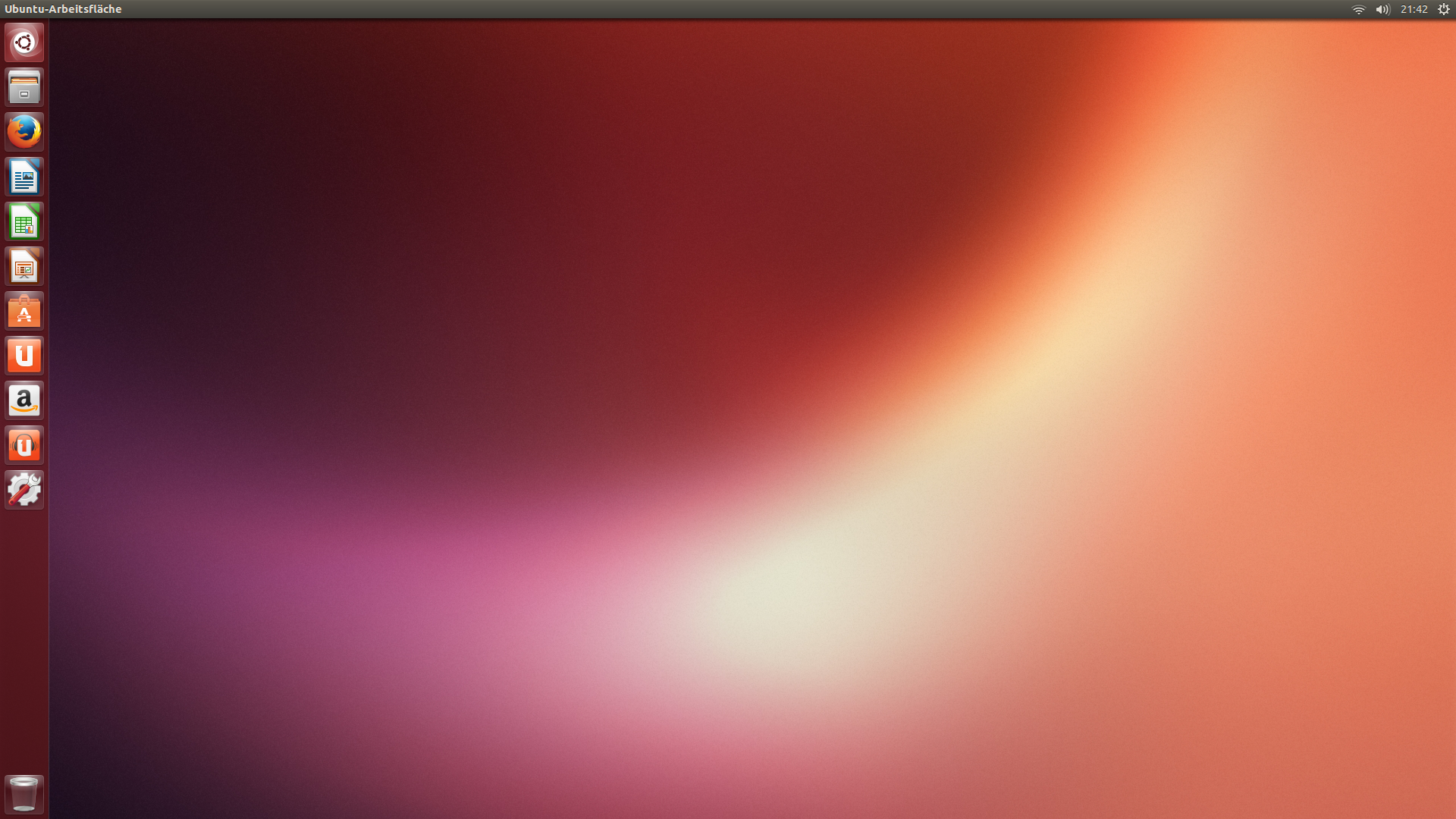
Ubuntu 13.04 (Raring Ringtail)

On 17 October 2012, Shuttleworth announced that Ubuntu 13.04 (Raring Ringtail) would focus on "mobile metrics, things like battery life, number of running processes, memory footprint, and polish the rough edges that we find when we do that." It was released on 25 April 2013, and support ended on 27 January 2014, after Canonicial reduced the support cycle for non-LTS releases to 9 months from 18 months. The Wubi installer for Windows was dropped due to its incompatibility with Windows 8 and general lack of support and development. It included Unity 7, which had many performance improvements, and searching of photos and social media posts from the Dash.

=== Ubuntu 13.10 (Saucy Salamander) ===
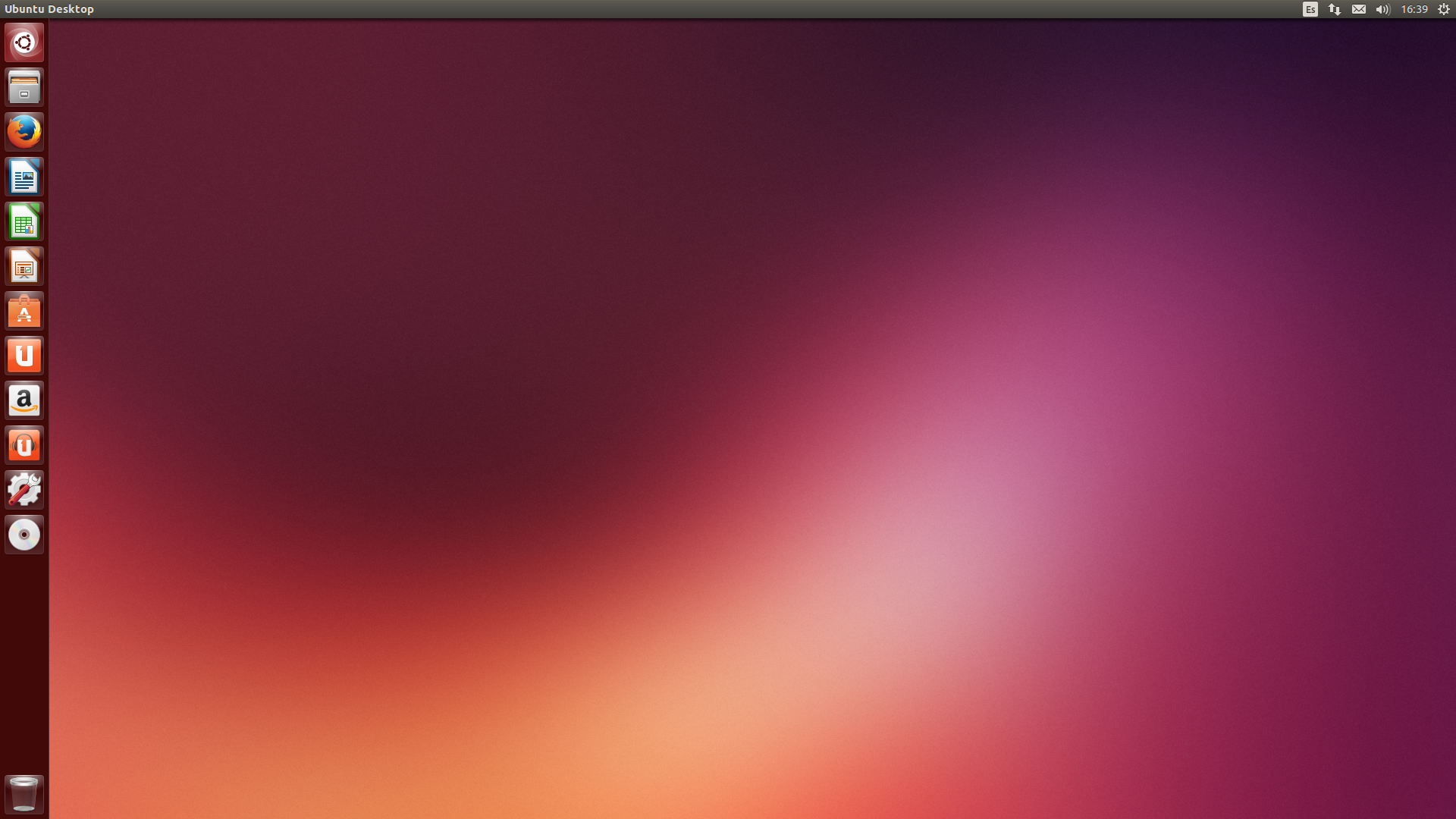
Ubuntu 13.10 (Saucy Salamander)

On 23 April 2013, Ubuntu 13.10 (Saucy Salamander) was announced by Mark Shuttleworth, and it was released on 17 October 2013. Support ended on 17 July 2014. Consideration was given to changing the default browser from Mozilla Firefox to Chromium, but problems with updates to Ubuntu's Chromium package caused developers to retain Firefox for this release. Similarly, the aging X Window System (X11) was intended to be replaced with the Mir display server, with X11 programs to have operated through the XMir compatibility layer. However, after the development of XMir ran into "outstanding technical difficulties" for multiple monitors, Canonical decided to postpone the default use of Mir in Ubuntu. Mir was still be released as the default display server for Ubuntu Touch 13.10.

Joey Sneddon of OMG Ubuntu criticized the new Smart Scopes feature, noting that internet search engines turn in more useful and better organized results and recommended selectively disabling individual scopes to reduce the noise factor. Jim Lynch of Linux Desktop Reviews described the release as "boring" and the Smart Scopes feature as "very useful". In its year-end Readers Choice Awards, Linux Journal readers voted Ubuntu as Best Linux Distribution and Best Desktop Distribution for 2013.

=== Ubuntu 14.04 LTS (Trusty Tahr) ===
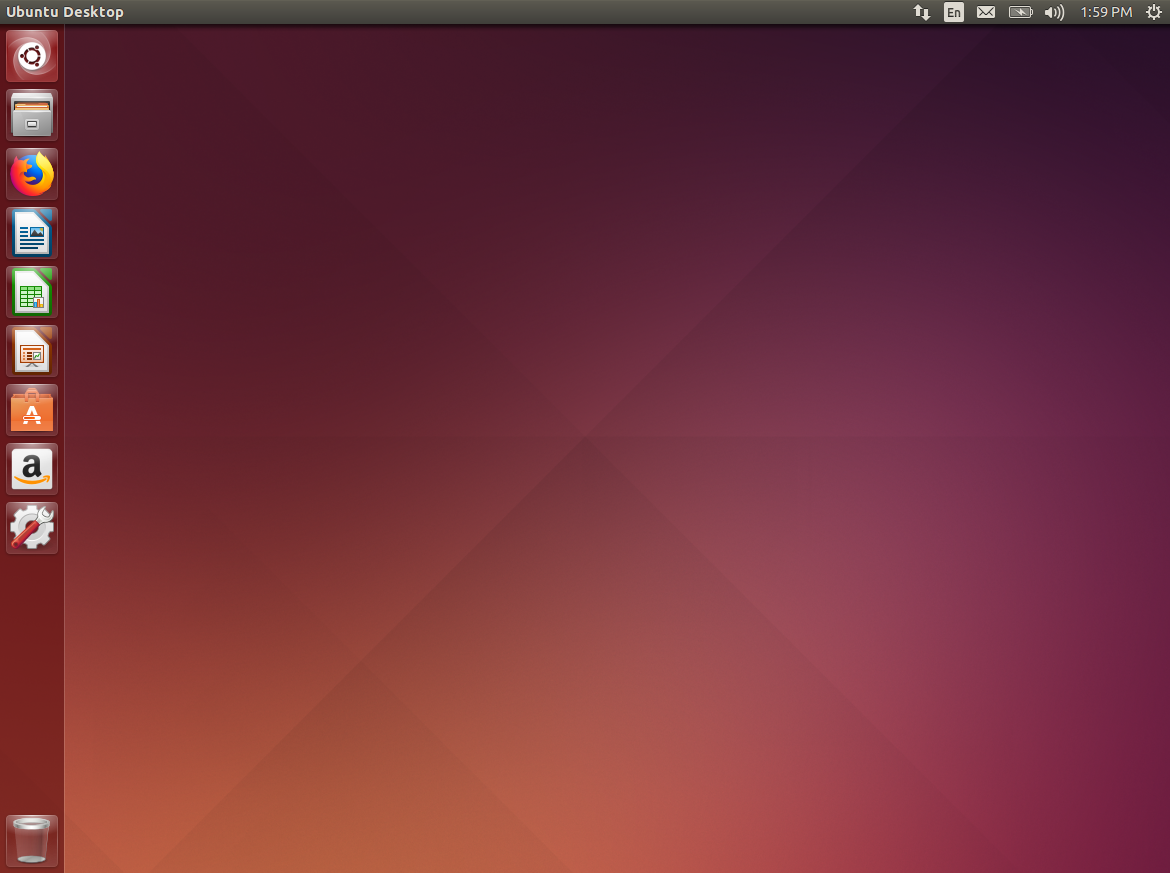
Ubuntu 14.04 Trusty Tahr

Mark Shuttleworth announced on 31 October 2011 that by Ubuntu 14.04, Ubuntu would support smartphones, tablets, TVs and smart screens.

On 18 October 2013, Shuttleworth announced that Ubuntu 14.04 (Trusty Tahr) would focus on "performance, refinement, maintainability, [sic] technical debt" and encouraged the developers to make "conservative choices". It was released on 17 April 2014. Support ended on 25 April 2019, after which extended security maintenance was available to Ubuntu Advantage customers for two more years. However, in September 2021, Canonical announced that it would extend LTS support for the 14.04 and 16.04 to a total of 10 years, extending ESM support for 14.04 until April 2024. In November 2025, Canonical announced they are further expanding LTS support to 15 years through their Legacy add-on, extending support for 14.04 through April 2029.

The development cycle for this release focused on the tablet interface, specifically the Nexus 7 and Nexus 10 tablets. Ubuntu 14.04 reintroduced the ability to turn off the global menu system and use locally integrated menus instead for individual applications. Other features included a Unity 8 developers' preview, new mobile applications, a redesigned Startup Disk Creator tool, a new forked version of the GNOME Control Center called the Unity Control Center, and default SSD TRIM support. GNOME 3.10 is installed by default.

In reviewing Ubuntu 14.04 LTS in April 2014, Jim Lynch concluded: "While there are not a lot of amazing new features in this release, there are quite a few very useful and needed tweaks that add up to a much better desktop experience. Canonical's designers seem to be listening to Ubuntu users again, and they seem willing to make the changes necessary to give the users what they want." Scott Gilbertson of Ars Technica stated, "Ubuntu is one of the most polished desktops around, certainly the most polished in the Linux world, but in many ways that polish is increasingly skin deep at the expense of some larger usability issues, which continue to go unaddressed release after release."

=== Ubuntu 14.10 (Utopic Unicorn) ===
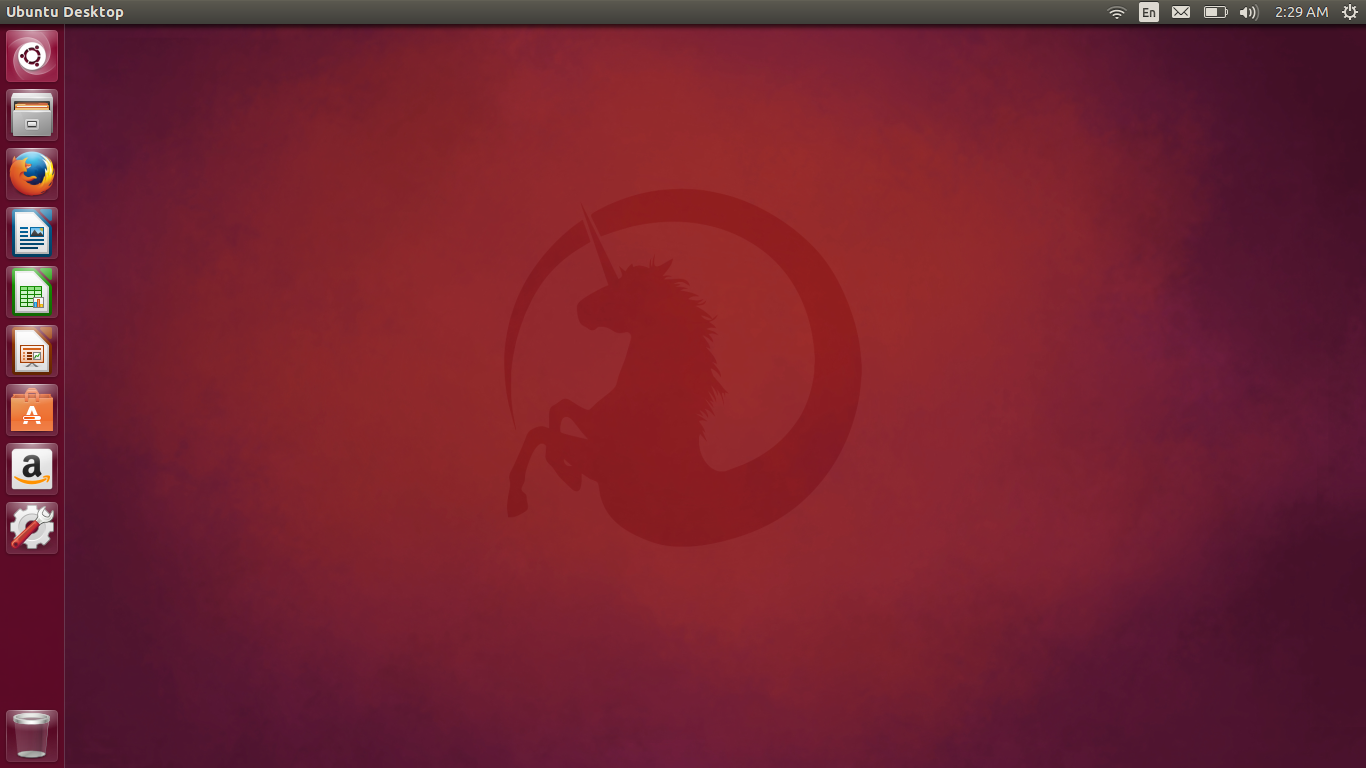
A screenshot of the Ubuntu 14.10 "Utopic Unicorn" desktop with the mascot wallpaper

Ubuntu 14.10 "Utopic Unicorn" was released on 23 October 2014. Scott Gilbertson of The Register found little changes in the release (which did not include a new wallpaper) as developers focused on developing the future Unity 8 desktop environment and Mir display server, noting that the release marked the Ubuntu project's 10-year anniversary.

=== Ubuntu 15.04 (Vivid Vervet) ===
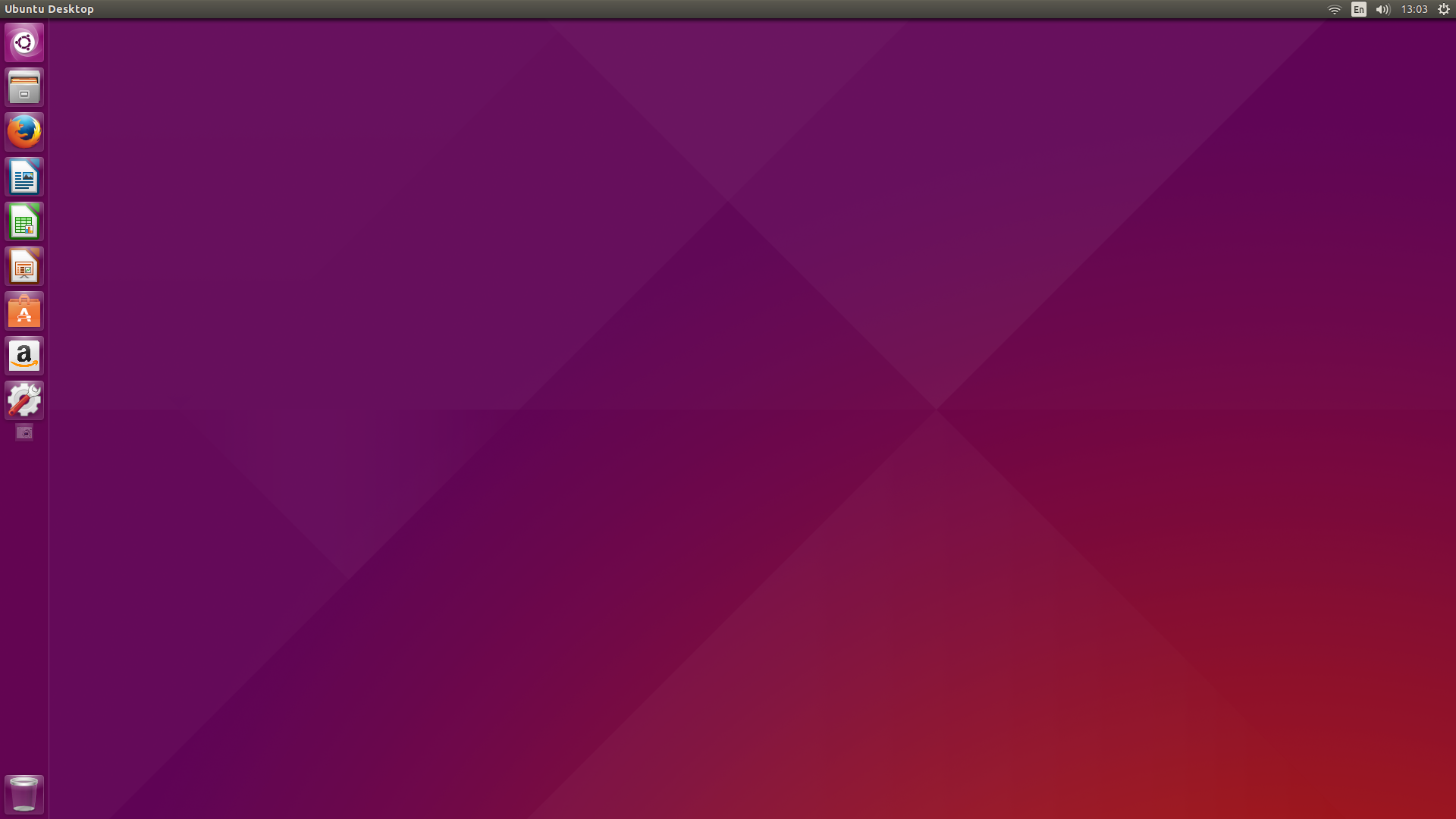
Ubuntu 15.04 Vivid Vervet

On 20 October 2014, Shuttleworth announced that Ubuntu 15.04 would be named Vivid Vervet. It was released on 23 April 2015. With this release, systemd became the default init implementation, replacing Upstart. Though Shuttleworth dislikes systemd, the change was made due to Ubuntu's reliance on Debian, which had switched to systemd. The Unity 7 desktop environment may now always show menu items. The beta version defaulted to showing menu items in the application window instead of the top bar, a change reverted in the stable release.

Jesse Smith of DistroWatch praised the stability of the release, especially amid the switch to systemd. Scott Gilbertson of Ars Technica criticised inconsistencies in the desktop environment amid Canonical's development focus on the upcoming Unity 8.

=== Ubuntu 15.10 (Wily Werewolf) ===
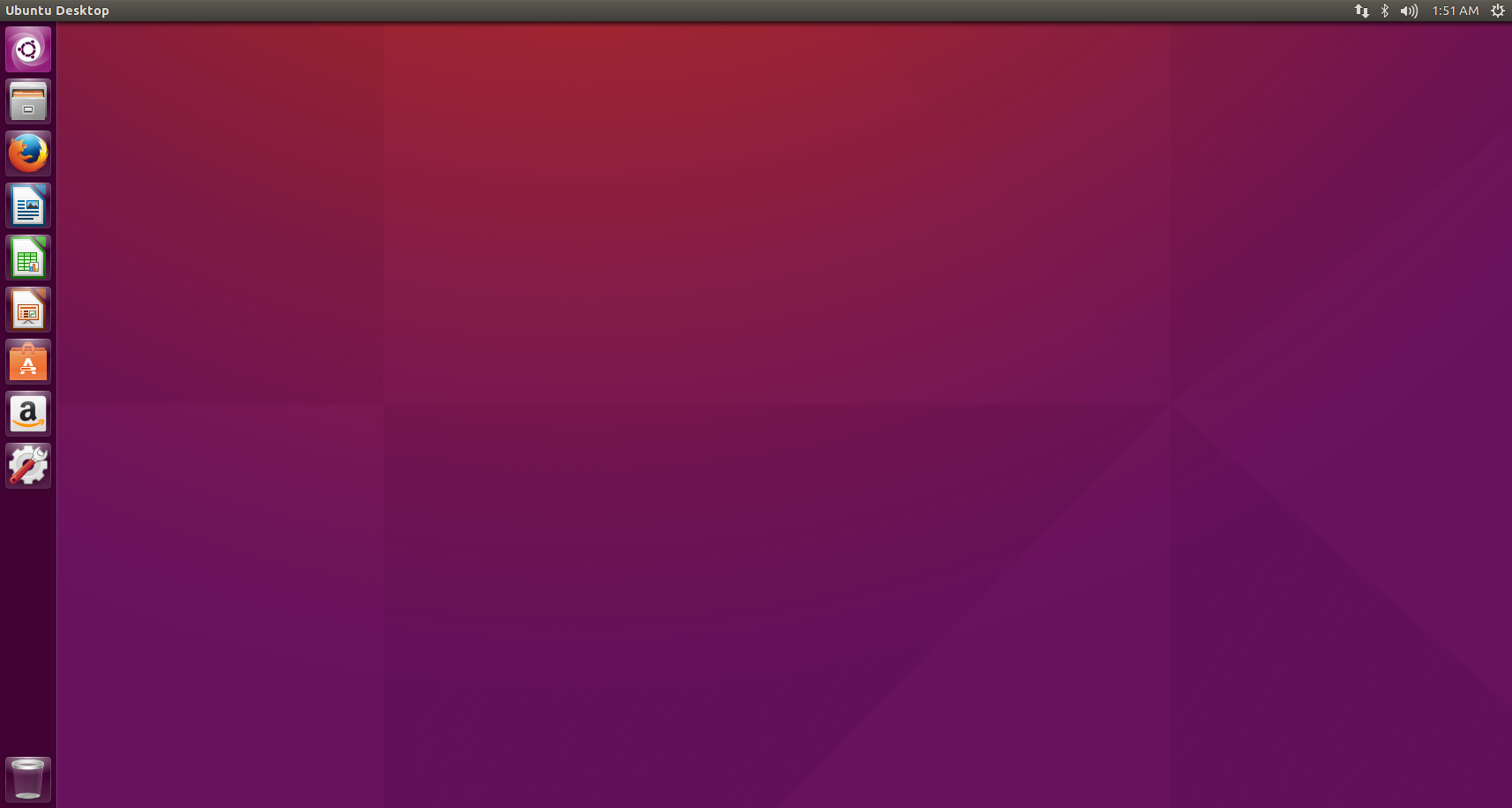
Ubuntu 15.10 Wily Werewolf

Shuttleworth announced on 4 May 2015 that Ubuntu 15.10 would be called Wily Werewolf. He initially expressed hope that the release would include the Mir display server, but it was released on 22 October 2015 without Mir. It eliminated the disappearing window edge scrollbars in favour of the upstream GNOME scrollbars, a move designed to save developer time in creating patches and updates.

Steven J. Vaughan-Nichols of ZDNET praised the release for its integration of cloud services, such as the new Ubuntu OpenStack cloud deployment and management tool "OpenStack Autopilot", as well as its server tools, especially Ubuntu's machine container hypervisor, LXD, included by default in 15.10. A Hectic Geek review noted problems with X.Org Server crashes and concluded "If you use Ubuntu 14.04 LTS and if it's working out for you, then there really is no need to switch to a non-LTS release, especially to the 15.10." A review on Dedoimedo identified problems with Samba, Bluetooth, desktop searching, battery life and the smartphone interface and found the release inconsistent.

=== Ubuntu 16.04 LTS (Xenial Xerus) ===
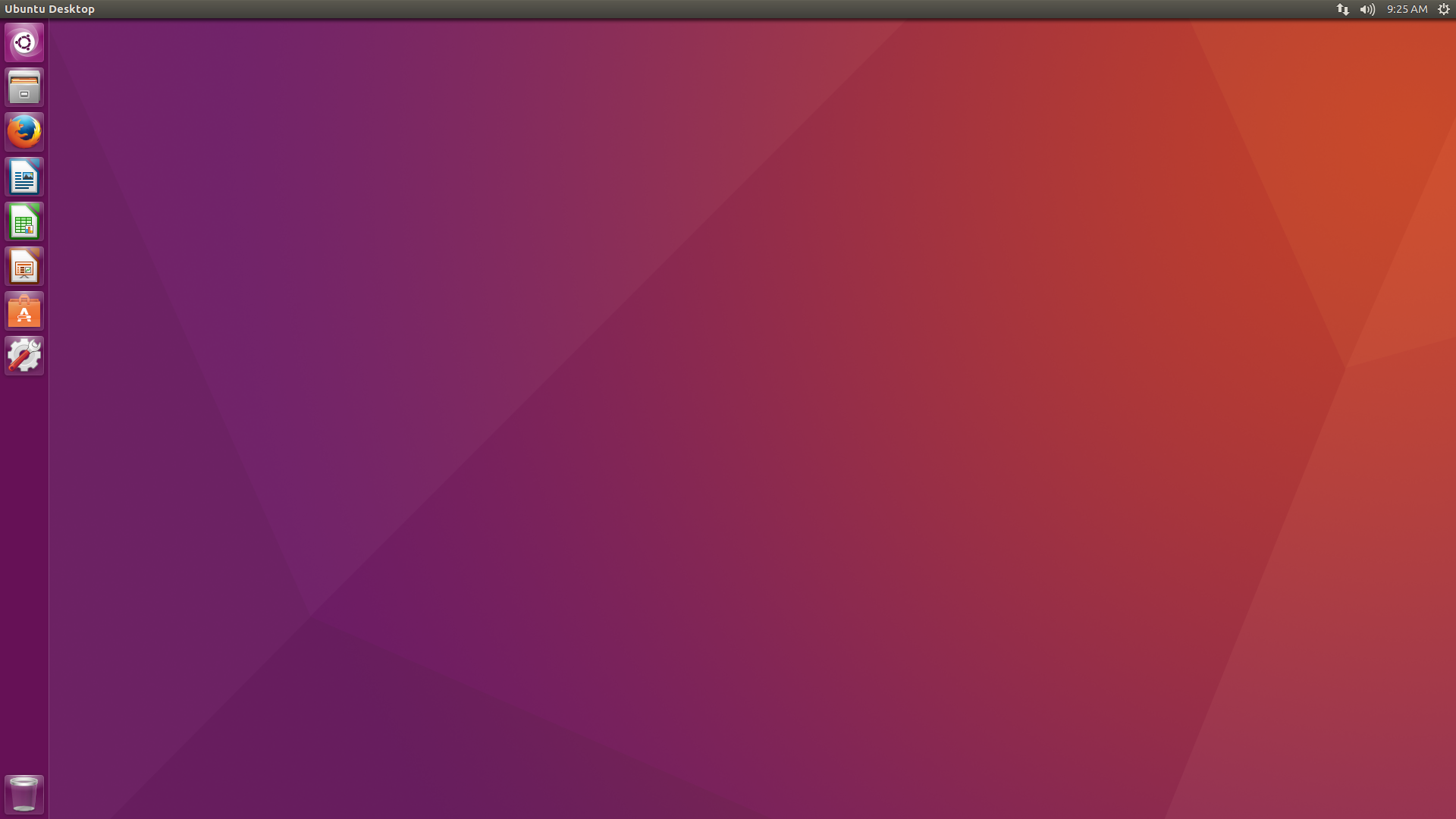
Ubuntu 16.04 LTS Xenial Xerus

Shuttleworth announced on 21 October 2015 that Ubuntu 16.04 LTS would be called Xenial Xerus and include an option for Unity 8. It was released on 21 April 2016. In September 2021, Canonical announced that it would extend LTS support for the 14.04 and 16.04 to a total of 10 years, extending the ESM support date for 16.04 until April 2026. The release adds support for Ceph and ZFS filesystems, the LXD hypervisor for OpenStack, and Snap packages.

This release has online Dash search results disabled by default in Unity 7, does not support the AMD Catalyst (fglrx) driver for AMD/ATI graphics cards, and instead recommends the Radeon and AMDGPU alternatives. It also replaced the Ubuntu Software Center with GNOME Software (rebranded as "Ubuntu Software") and eliminated Empathy and Brasero from the ISO file.

=== Ubuntu 16.10 (Yakkety Yak) ===
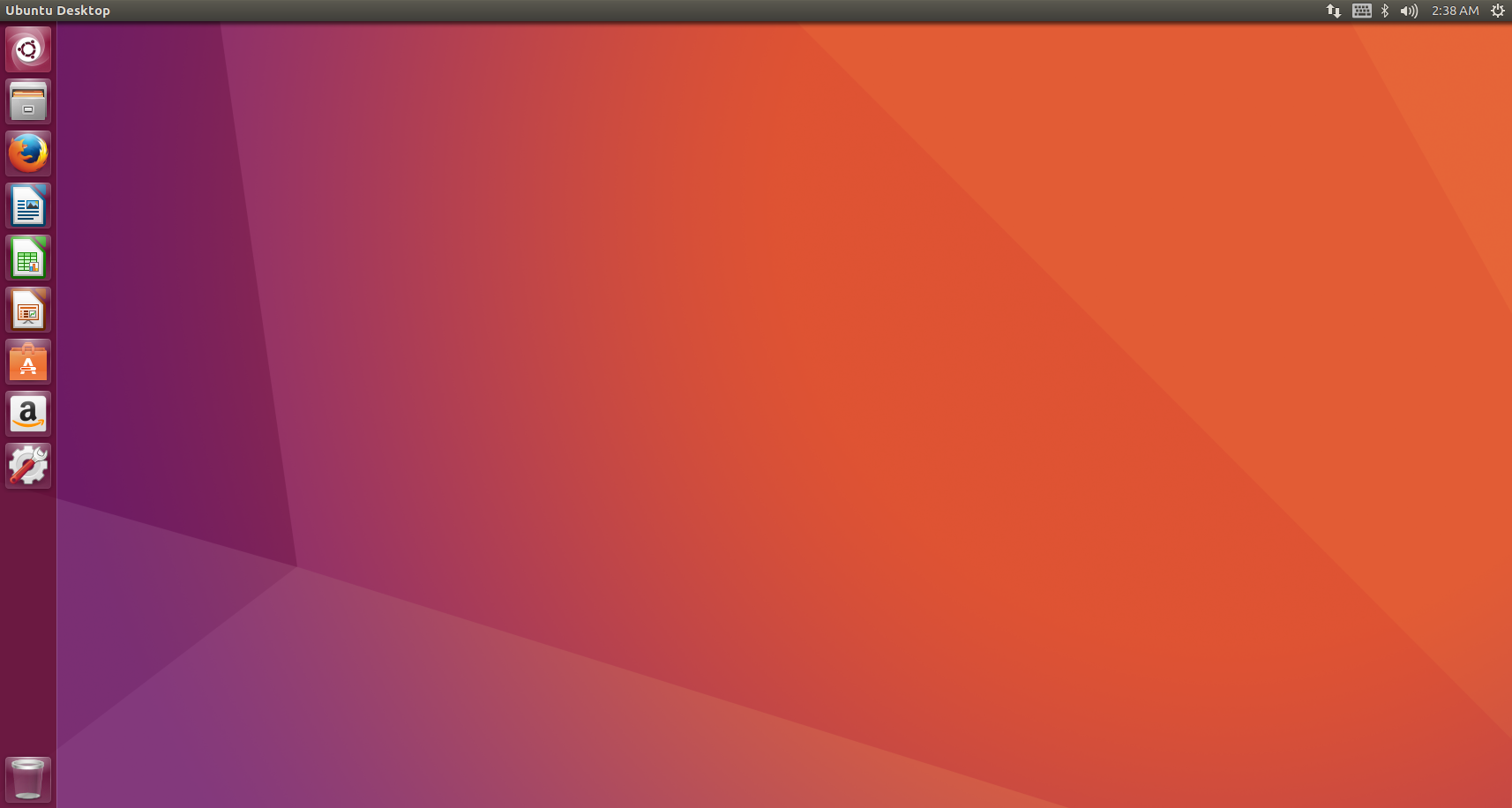
Ubuntu 16.10 Yakkety Yak

Mark Shuttleworth announced on 21 April 2016 that Ubuntu 16.10 would be called Yakkety Yak. It was released on 13 October 2016. This release includes a faster version of Ubuntu Software, better support for installing command-line-only applications, support for installing fonts and multimedia codecs, paid applications, changelog entries for Personal Package Archives (PPAs) in the Update Manager, user session handling by systemd, and Linux kernel 4.8.

=== Ubuntu 17.04 (Zesty Zapus) ===
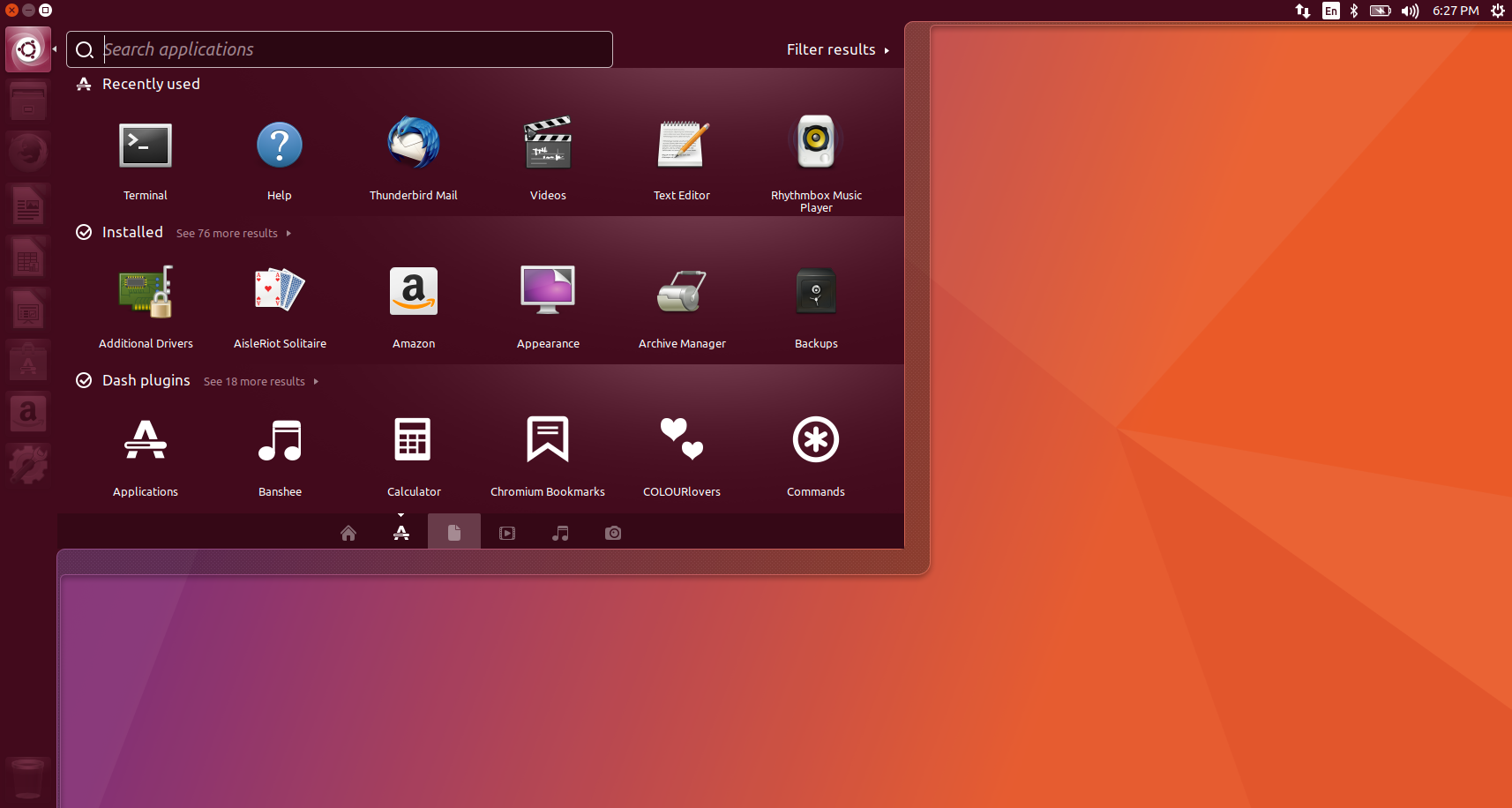
Ubuntu 17.04 Zesty Zapus

On 17 October 2016, Mark Shuttleworth announced that the codename of Ubuntu 17.04, released on 13 April 2017, would be Zesty Zapus. This release dropped support for the 32-bit PowerPC architecture, following the same move by the upstream Debian project. Other changes include the default DNS resolver now being systemd-resolved, Linux kernel 4.10, and included support for printers. Reviewers noted that this was likely to be the last version of Ubuntu to ship with Unity 7 by default before Ubuntu's switch to GNOME, matching the end of the alphabet in Ubuntu's codename scheme.

=== Ubuntu 17.10 (Artful Aardvark) ===
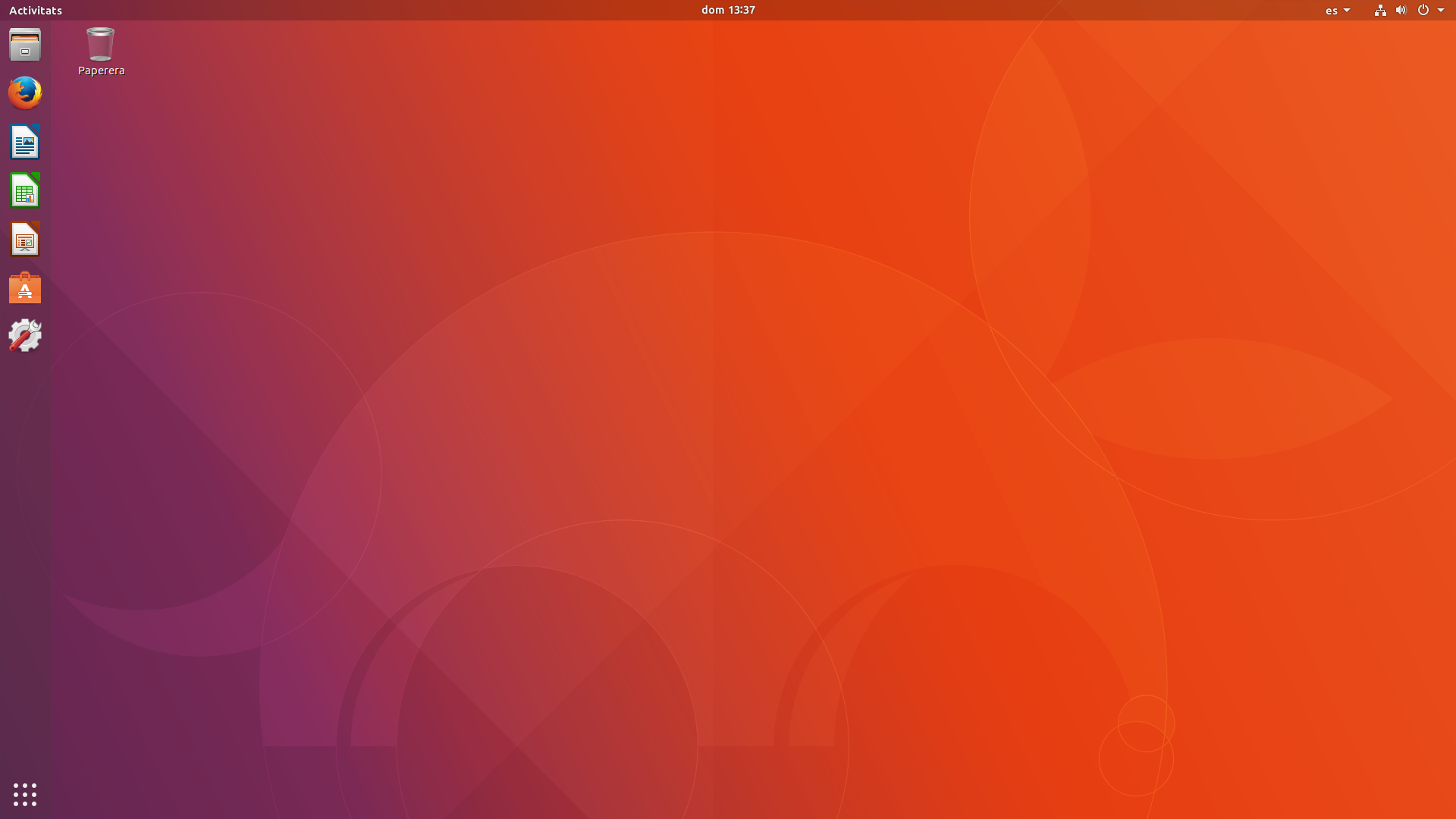
Ubuntu 17.10 Artful Aardvark

Artful Aardvark was announced via Launchpad on 21 April 2017 instead of on Shuttleworth's blog as had been the case in the past. It was released on 19 October 2017. Critics praised the smooth transition to GNOME and the significance of the release's changes.

This is the first release of Ubuntu to use the GNOME Shell interface, and the first release to replace X11 with the Wayland display server. In May 2017, Ken VanDine, a Canonical Software Engineer on the Ubuntu desktop team tasked with the switch to GNOME, confirmed that the intention is to ship the most current version of GNOME, with very few changes from a stock installation. This release also dropped 32-bit desktop images; other images' 32-bit versions remain.

=== Ubuntu 18.04 LTS (Bionic Beaver) ===
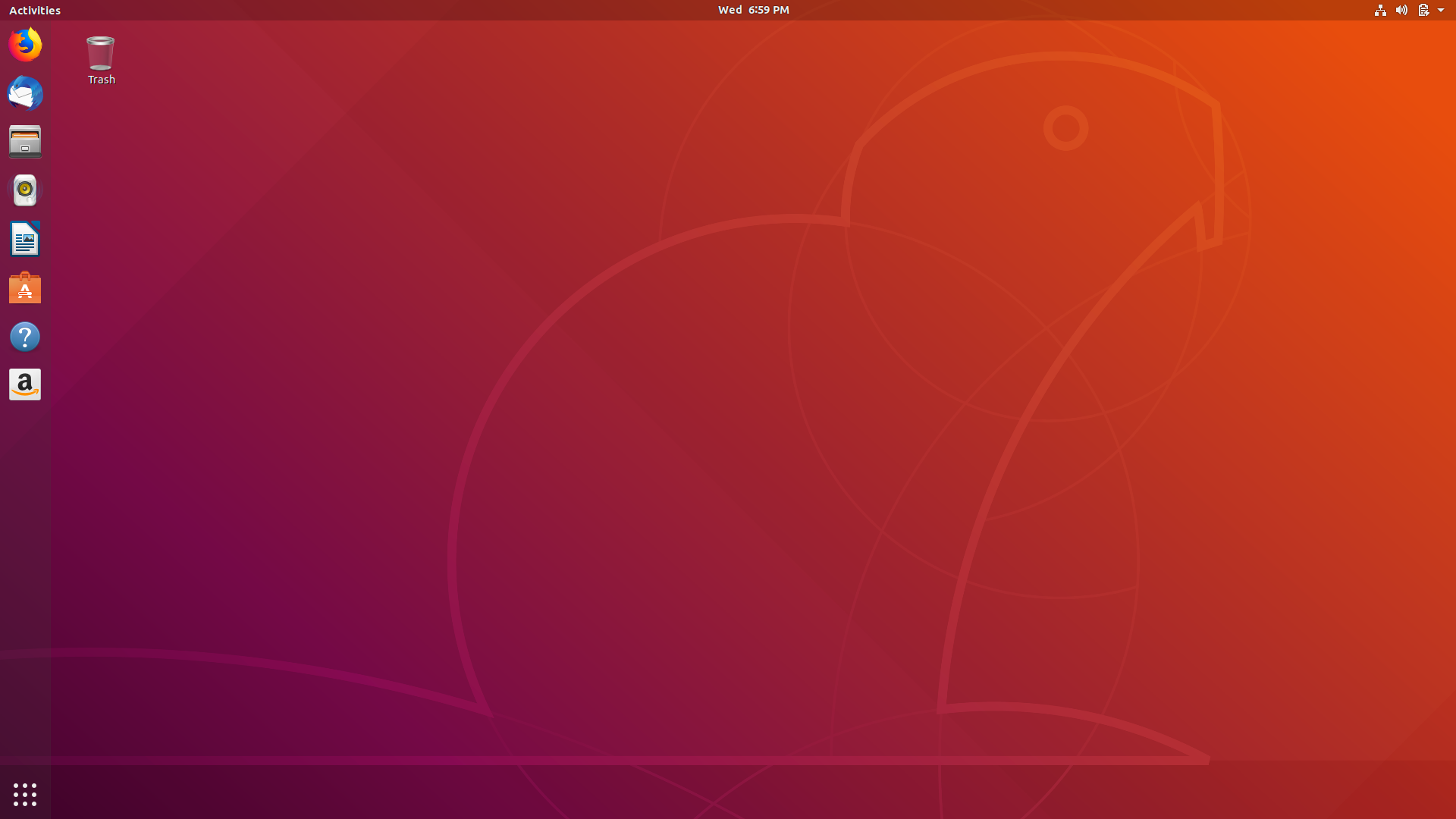
Ubuntu 18.04 LTS Bionic Beaver

Ubuntu 18.04 LTS Bionic Beaver, the seventh LTS release, is a long-term support version that was announced on 24 October 2017 on Shuttleworth's blog and released on 26 April 2018. Ubuntu 18.04 LTS had normal LTS support for five years until May 2023 and has paid ESM support available from Canonical for an additional five years until April 2028. New features include colour emoji, a new To-Do application preinstalled in the default installation, the "Minimal Install" option in the system installer, which only installs a web browser and system tools, and new command-line system installer for Ubuntu Server. This release employed Linux kernel 4.15, which incorporated a CPU controller for the cgroup v2 interface, AMD secure memory encryption support and improved SATA Link Power Management.

Ubuntu 18.04 LTS's default display server was returned to Xorg for more stability; Wayland was still included as part of the default install. For the first time some bundled applications were delivered by default as snaps.

Plans to include a new theme, Communitheme (now Yaru), created by the Ubuntu community, were announced on 5 February 2018. However, Ubuntu 18.04 LTS did not include it, citing "outstanding bugs, a lack of broader testing, as well as ongoing gaps in corner-case usage." The new theme was available as a Snap package instead.

=== Ubuntu 18.10 (Cosmic Cuttlefish) ===
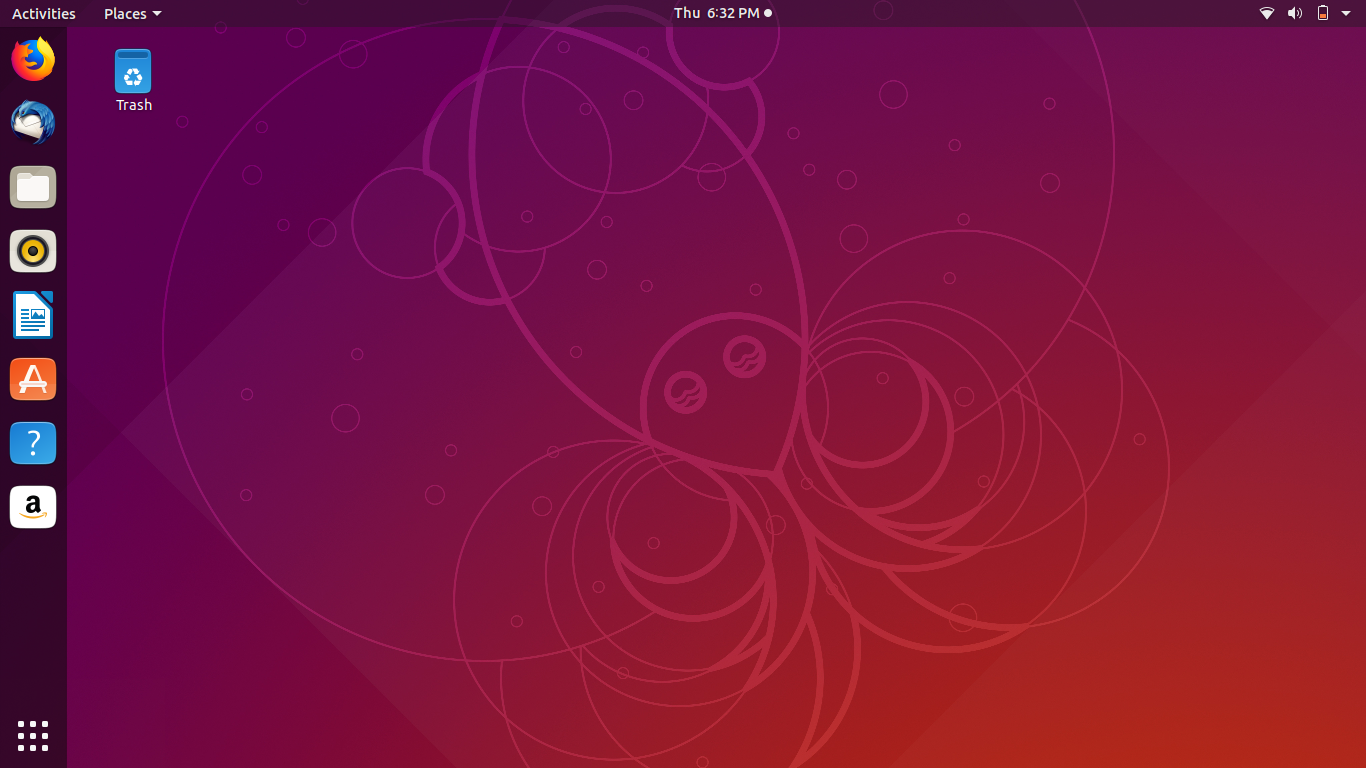
Ubuntu 18.10 Cosmic Cuttlefish

Shuttleworth announced Ubuntu 18.10 Cosmic Cuttlefish on 8 May 2018. It was released on 18 October 2018. Installation speeds are faster due to the use of a lossless compression algorithm known as Zstandard. Startup speeds of pre-installed Snap applications were also improved.

Ubuntu 18.10 includes a new theme, Yaru, as the default theme, along with its accompanying icon theme, Suru.

=== Ubuntu 19.04 (Disco Dingo) ===
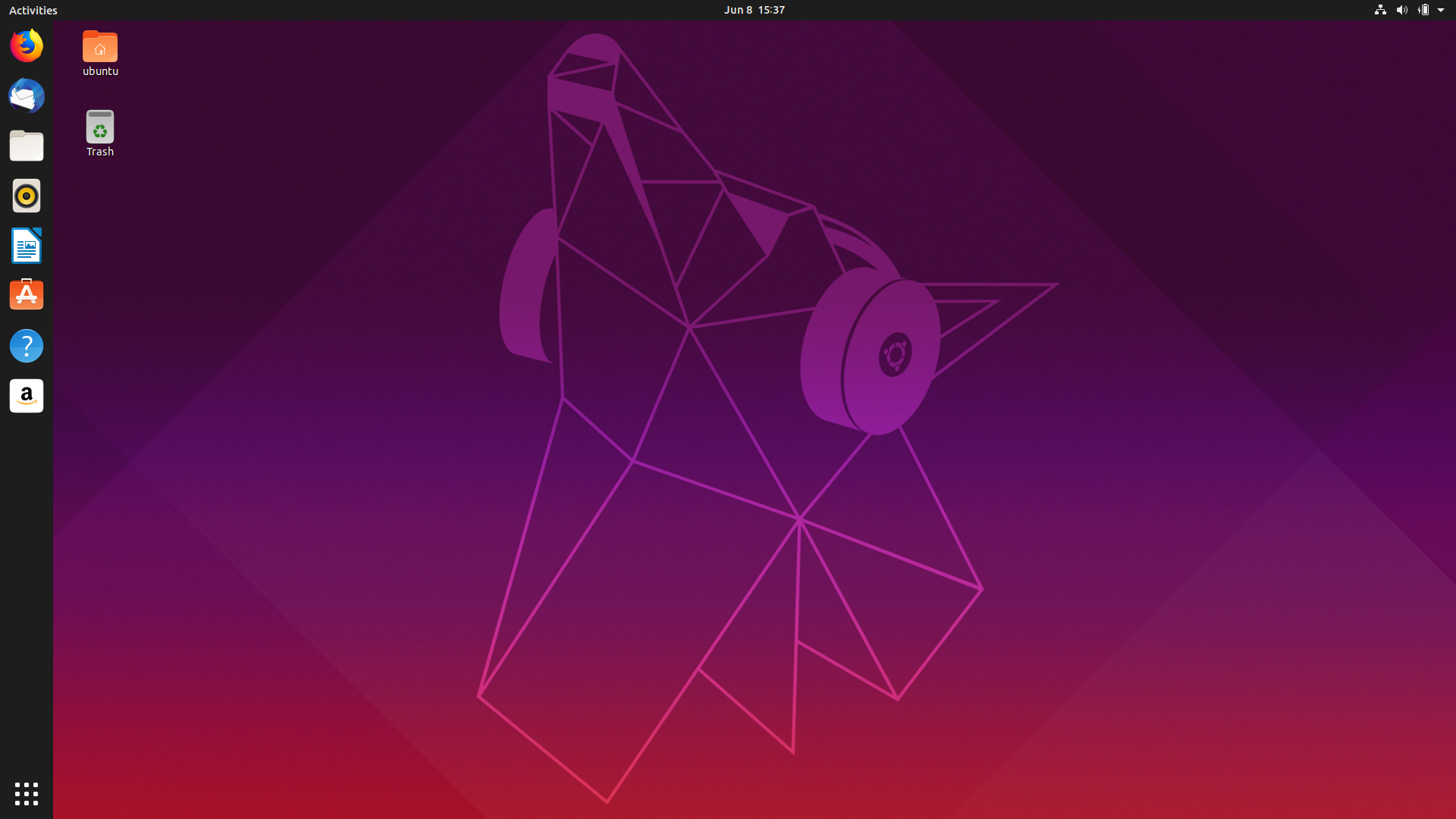
Ubuntu 19.04 Disco Dingo

Shuttleworth announced Ubuntu 19.04 Disco Dingo on 20 October 2018. It was released on 18 April 2019. It incorporates Linux kernel 5.0, which adds support for AMD FreeSync technology for liquid-crystal displays, Raspberry Pi touchscreens, Adiantum encryption, Btrfs swap files as well as many USB 3.2 and Type-C improvements and several other new hardware. It uses GNOME 3.32, which includes a new icon set, night light intensity control, advanced application permissions, favoriting files, and a new header bar as well as 'find' and 'read only' modes in the default terminal emulator. Version 19 of the open-source graphics drivers Mesa is natively available in this version of Ubuntu. Furthermore, the Grub menu now allows a 'safe graphics' mode in case of issues with graphics cards or graphics drivers. Geoclue integration and fractional scaling in the GNOME Shell for HiDPI displays are also included. Improvements for running Ubuntu on a VMWare virtual machine include integration of open-vm-tools within Ubuntu, allowing for bi-directional clipboard and file sharing.

Ubuntu Server 19.04 updated QEMU to version 3.1, allowing for creation of a virtual 3D GPU inside QEMU virtual machines. libvirt was updated to version 5.0 and Samba was updated to version 4.10.x. Samba and its dependencies were updated to Python 3, with the exception of tdb, which still builds a Python 2 package, namely python-tdb. Ubuntu Server 19.04 includes the latest OpenStack release, Stein, and has vSwitch version 2.11.

=== Ubuntu 19.10 (Eoan Ermine) ===
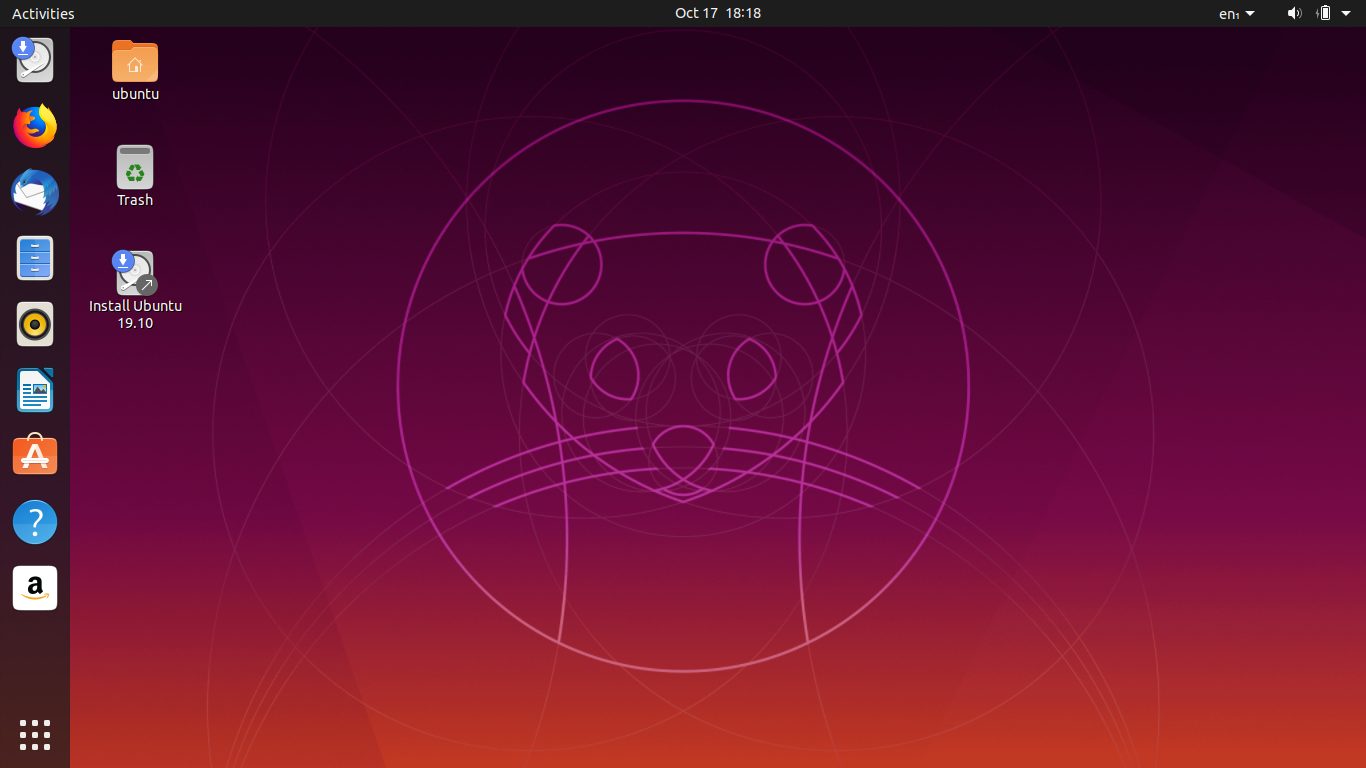
Ubuntu 19.10 Eoan Ermine

Shuttleworth announced Ubuntu 19.10, codenamed Eoan Ermine on 3 April 2019. It was released on 17 October 2019. It uses Linux kernel 5.3 which, among others, introduces compatibility for third-generation Ryzen CPU motherboards and associated Intel Wireless devices as well as AMD's 7 nm Navi GPUs.

Experimental support for the ZFS filesystem is now available from the installer. NVIDIA-specific improvements were made. Proprietary Nvidia graphics drivers are now bundled with the installer in place of the open-source Nouveau drivers. Support for the Raspberry Pi 4 platform was added. The installation media now uses LZ4 compression which, compared to the previously used compression algorithm, gzip, offers faster installation times. This was decided following benchmarking of a variety of compression algorithms conducted by the Ubuntu kernel team. Kernel load and decompression times were tested and LZ4 was found to offer decompression as much as seven times faster. Ubuntu 19.10 uses GNOME 3.34 which, among others, adds the ability to group application icons into folders, introduces a background settings panel and a separate Night Light tab as well as improves upon performance and smoothness. A new Yaru light theme was introduced with this release as well.

In a November 2019 Ars Technica review by Scott Gilbertson, he concluded, "Ubuntu 19.10 is unusual for an October Ubuntu release in that I would call it a must-have upgrade. While it retains some of the experimental elements Ubuntu's fall releases have always been known for, the speed boosts to GNOME alone make this release well worth your time."

=== Ubuntu 20.04 LTS (Focal Fossa) ===
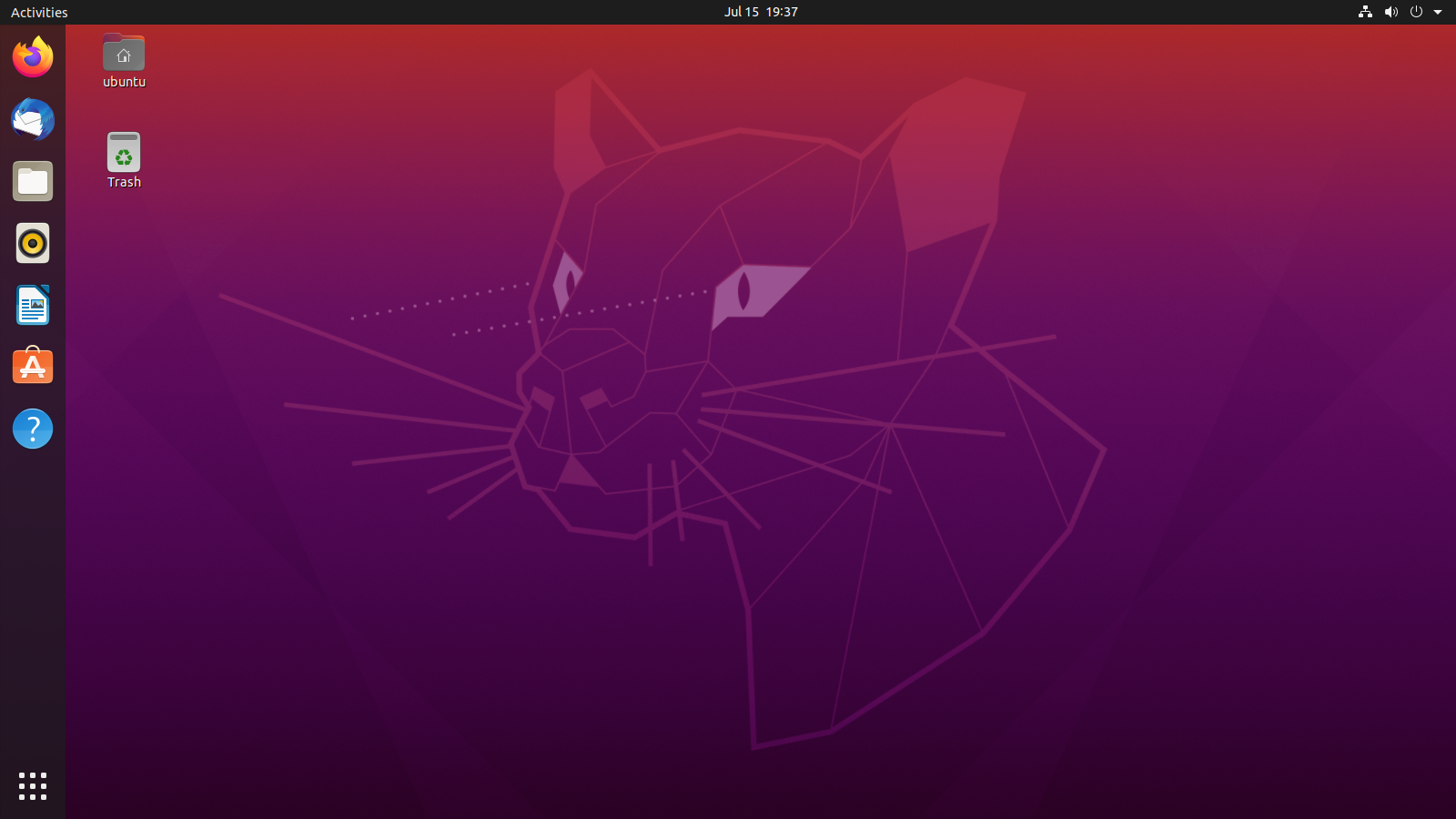
Ubuntu 20.04 LTS Focal Fossa

On 17 August 2019, Ubuntu 20.04 LTS, codenamed Focal Fossa was announced by Shuttleworth. It was released on 23 April 2020, and as a long-term support release, it received maintenance updates for 5 years until April 2025. This release is based on Linux kernel 5.4 LTS which adds support for new hardware including Intel's Comet Lake and Tiger Lake CPUs, Qualcomm's Snapdragon 835 and 855 SoCs as well as AMD Navi 12 and 14 GPUs. It also adds support for reboot-free kernel updates, the exFAT filesystem, the open-source WireGuard VPN, and a security module named Lockdown, disabled by default, which aims to prevent privileged root accounts from interacting with the underlying kernel by restricting kernel functionality, disallowing execution of arbitrary code and enforcing kernel module signatures. Python 2 is no longer included by default. This release refreshed the Yaru theme and uses GNOME 3.36 which revamped the login screen. Improvements have also been made to the system menu and the installation screen, which now shows a graphical drive checking routine. The ZFS file system is now offered as an option in the installer and tools for it are now bundled.

The OEM logo is now displayed during boot. Ubuntu Software will now only install packages from the Snap Store and provide an option for selecting the desired release channel to install from. This release also ended all support for the 32-bit architecture. DEB files now open in Archive Manager by default.

Reviewers praised the stability, polish and speed of the release. Joey Sneddon of OMG Ubuntu noted the significant number of major changes compared to other recent LTS releases. However, Jesse Smith of DistroWatch gave a negative review, citing boot and stability issues, lack of documentation and functionality of ZFS tools, lack of Flatpak support, and the decision to have Ubuntu Software only offer Snaps—a Flatpak alternative developed by Canonical, criticized as few in number, slow, heavily memory-consuming and bad at integration.

=== Ubuntu 20.10 (Groovy Gorilla) ===
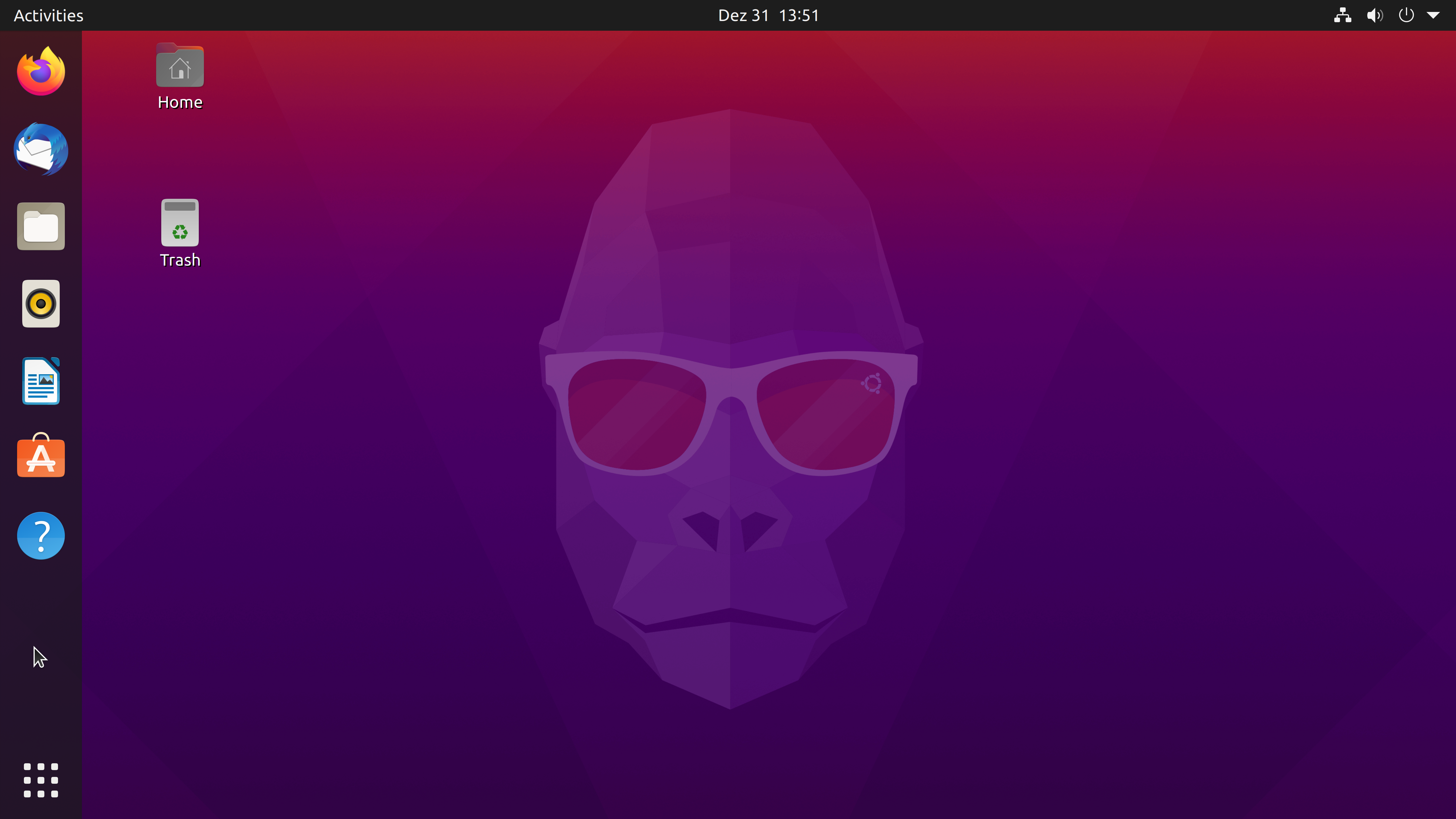
Ubuntu 20.10 Groovy Gorilla

Ubuntu 20.10, codenamed Groovy Gorilla, was released on 22 October 2020. This release is based on GNOME 3.38 and Linux kernel 5.8 which includes support for USB4, AMD Zen 3 CPUs, Intel Ice Lake and Tiger Lake processors, and initial support for booting Power10 processors. In addition, nftables is now the default firewall backend, replacing iptables. Ubuntu 20.10 is the first release to feature desktop images for the Raspberry Pi 4 (4 GB and 8 GB models) and the Compute Module 4. Older Pi models with less memory are not officially supported.

=== Ubuntu 21.04 (Hirsute Hippo) ===
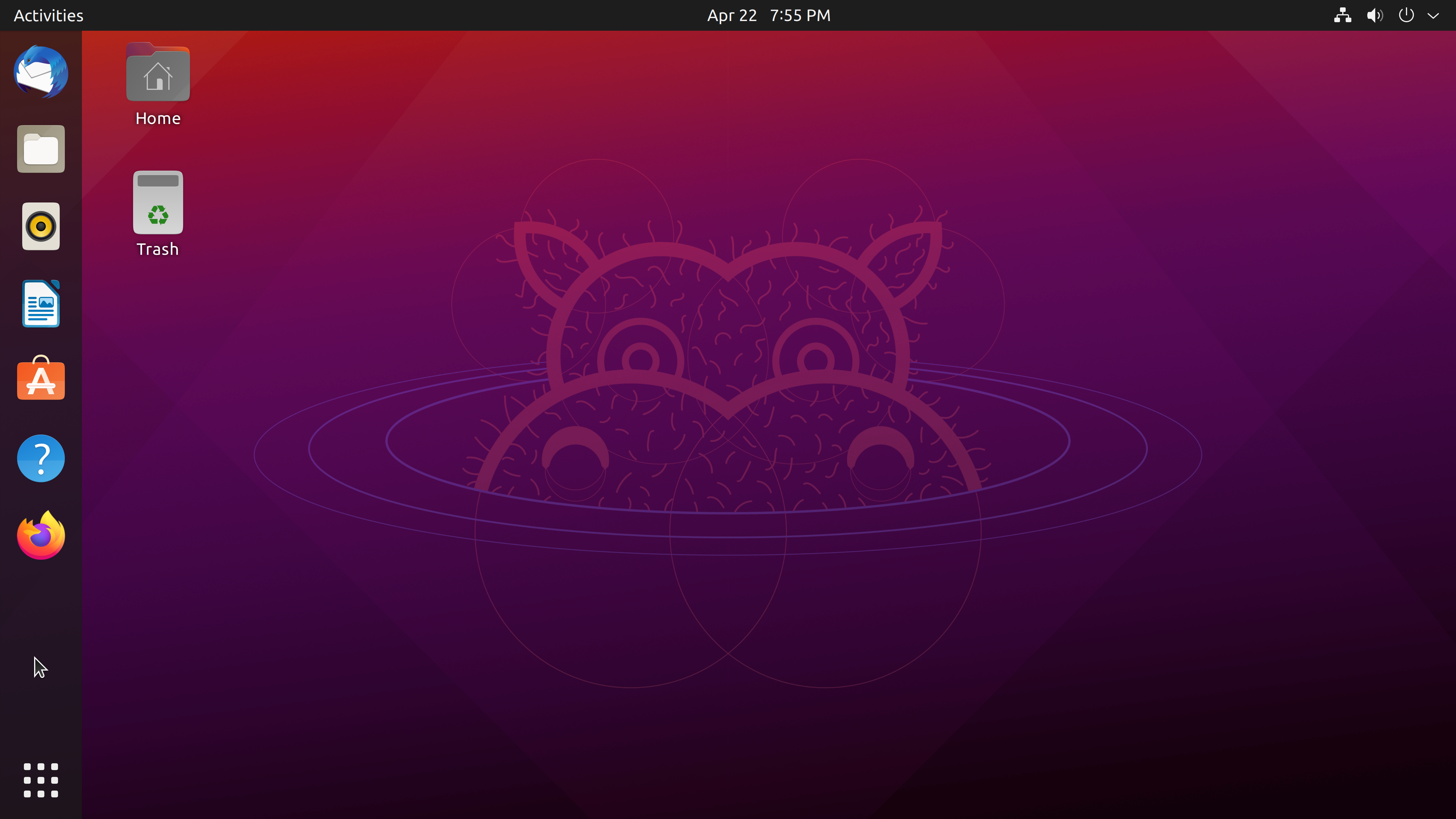
Ubuntu 21.04 Hirsute Hippo

Ubuntu 21.04, codenamed Hirsute Hippo, was released on 22 April 2021. It uses Linux kernel 5.11 which introduces smartcard authentication, support for Intel's Software Guard Extensions and improved support for AMD CPUs and GPUs.

Wayland is now used as the default on hardware without Nvidia graphics processors. Support for drag and drop from the file manager to the desktop was also added. An update to GNOME 40 was canceled due to questions about the stability of the GTK4 toolkit, a major GNOME interface redesign, and its unknown impact on GNOME extensions and Ubuntu's default Yaru GTK theme.

In a review, Joey Sneddon of OMG Ubuntu praised the stability and new features: "But it's not a release totally devoid of value. Ubuntu 21.04 features a striking new dark theme and makes a raft of smaller UI tweaks that add up to an impressive, polished whole. There are also new installer features, a new desktop icons experience, and (of course) a new wallpaper."

=== Ubuntu 21.10 (Impish Indri) ===
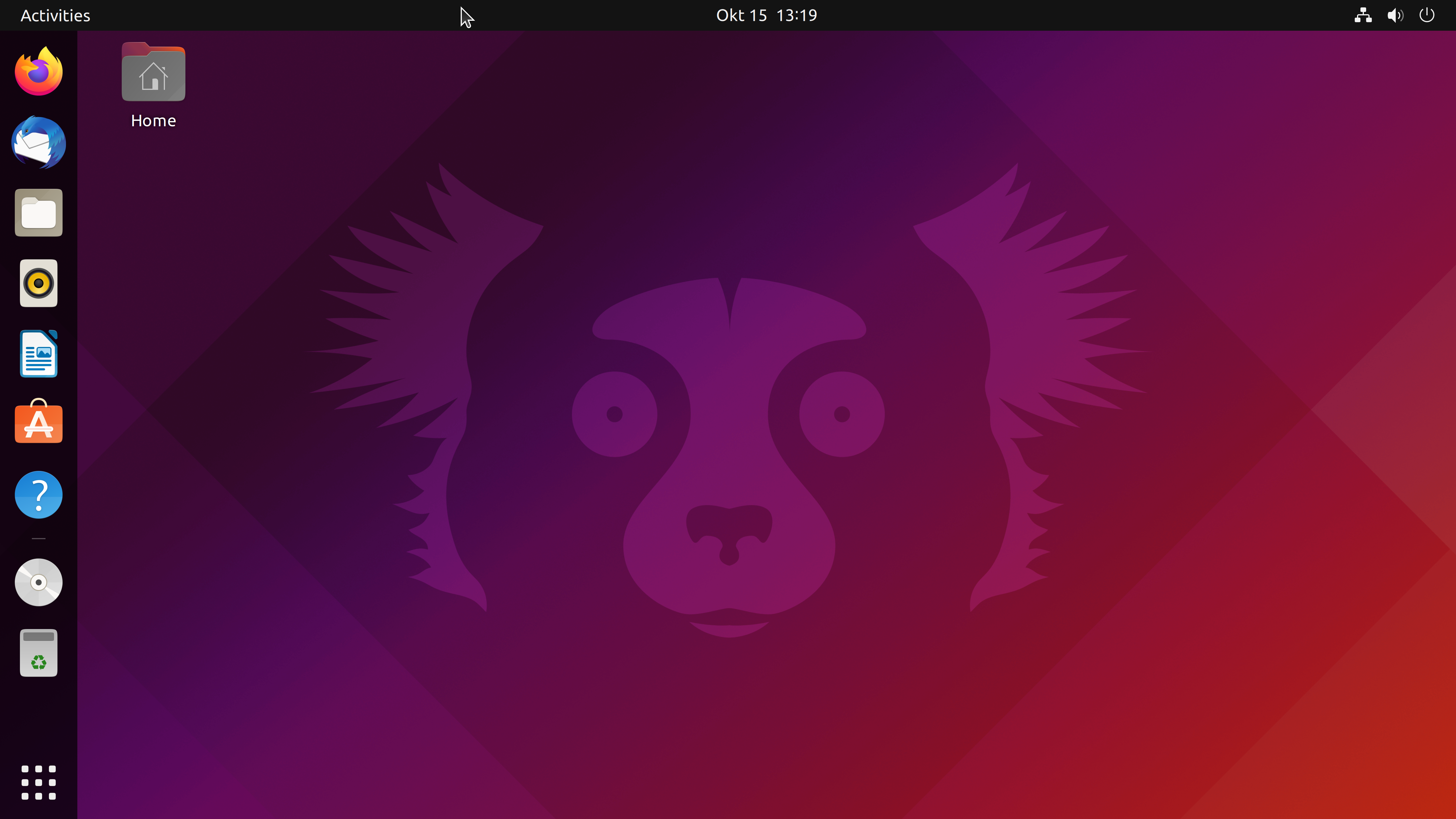
Ubuntu 21.10 Impish Indri

Ubuntu 21.10, codenamed Impish Indri, was released on 14 October 2021. It uses Linux kernel 5.13, which introduces rudimentary support for Apple M1 chips, FreeSync HDMI support for AMD GPUs, a new "Landlock" security module and support for several new hardware.

This release transitions from GNOME 3.38 to GNOME 40, which introduces a horizontal workspace switcher and an improved Activities Overview design. The Ubuntu Dock remains vertically placed on the left of the screen and now features separators between pinned and running applications, a persistent trash can icon and USB drive shortcuts. After logging in, the user will be shown the desktop instead of the Activities Overview. Despite Ubuntu 21.10 shipping with GNOME 40, a few GNOME 41 apps are available. A Firefox Snap is now installed by default on Ubuntu 21.10 instead of the deb package, which remained available. Furthermore, the Nvidia proprietary drivers now support Wayland sessions. The default Yaru theme was also updated with new icons and Zstd compression was enabled in the main archive, making installations faster.

=== Ubuntu 22.04 LTS (Jammy Jellyfish) ===
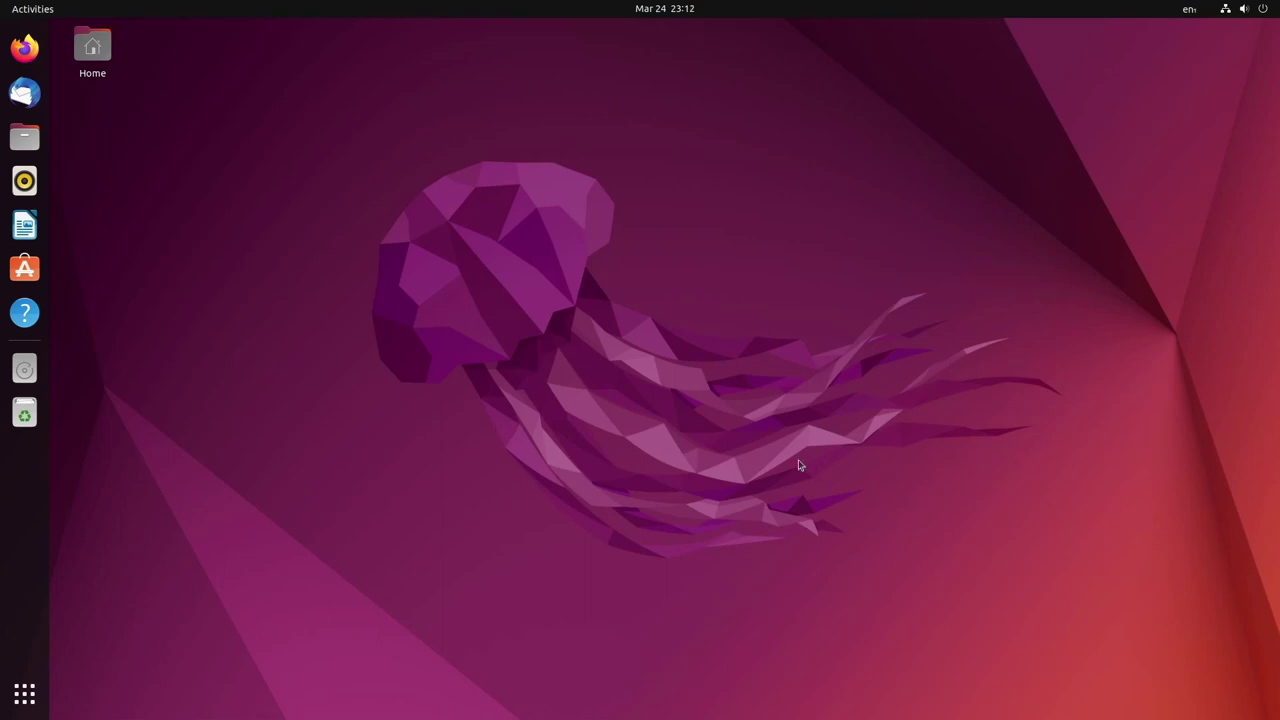
Ubuntu 22.04 LTS Jammy Jellyfish

Ubuntu 22.04, codenamed Jammy Jellyfish, was released on 21 April 2022, and is a long-term support release, supported for five years, until April 2027. Ubuntu 22.04 LTS Desktop uses Linux kernel 5.17 for newer hardware and a rolling HWE (hardware enablement) kernel based on version 5.15 for other hardware; Ubuntu 22.04 LTS Server uses version 5.15, while Ubuntu Cloud and Ubuntu for IoT use an optimized kernel based on version 5.15. It updates Python to 3.10 and Ruby to 3.0.

The desktop is a mix of GNOME 41 and 42 applications to avoid libadwaita. The default web browser, Firefox, is only available as a snap package and the release repositories no longer provide an alternative .deb package. This release includes two Yaru themes, light and dark, with a choice of ten different accent colors for customization. A planned notification asking to enable Ubuntu Pro, a free-for-home-use rebrand of Ubuntu Advantage, was dropped from the release after user backlash.

While most reviews were positive, DistroWatch reviewer Jesse Smith was critical of the release, citing several bugs, inconsistent design, and stagnation, writing:

I think the launch of Ubuntu 22.04 is a clear sign Canonical is much more interested in publishing releases on a set schedule than producing something worthwhile. This version was not ready for release and it is probably going to be a costly endeavour to maintain this collection of mixed versioned software and mixed display server and mixed designs for a full five years. It's a platform I would recommend avoiding.

In a poll conducted by DistroWatch, 70% of readers expressed dislike at Ubuntu migrating packages to being snap-only.

=== Ubuntu 22.10 (Kinetic Kudu) ===
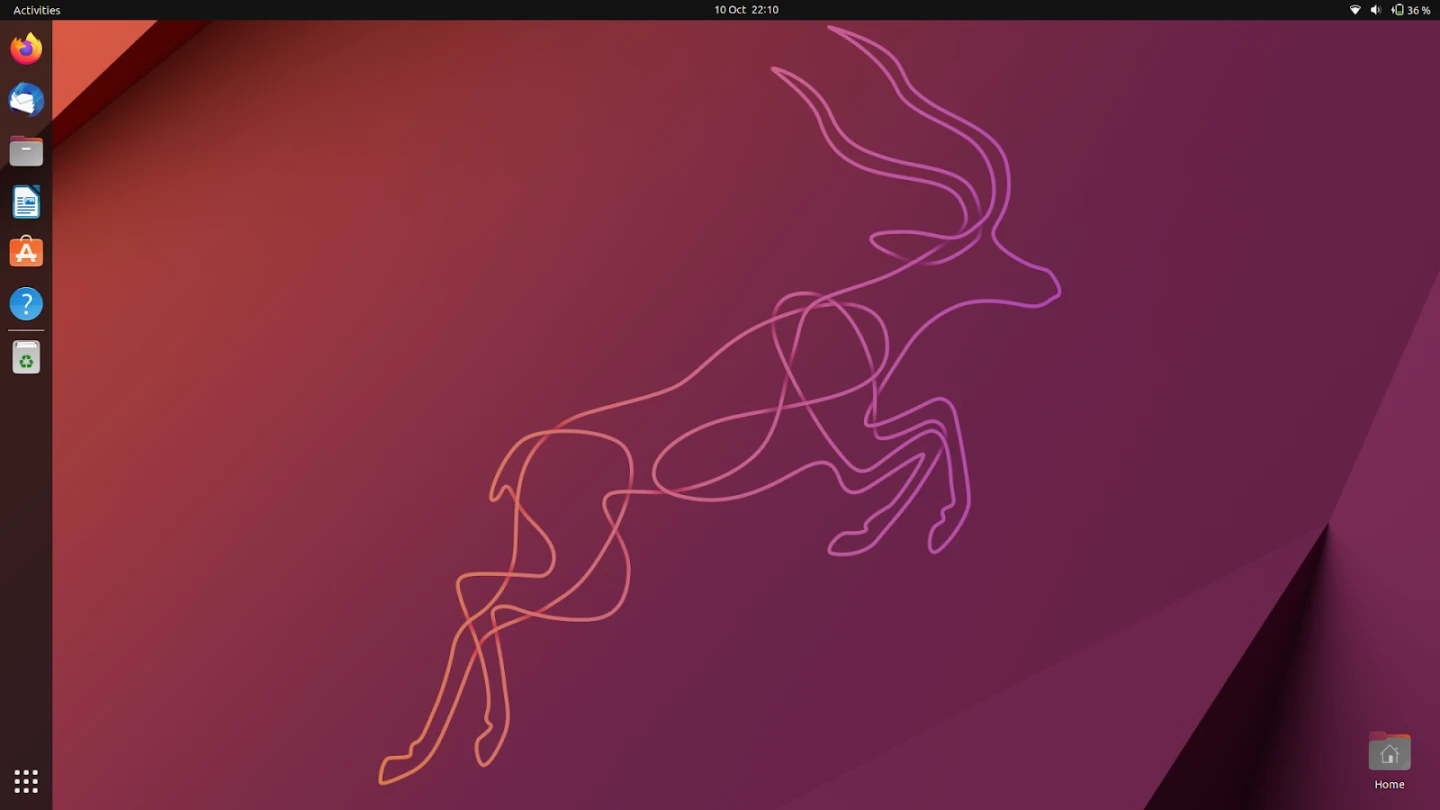
Ubuntu 22.10 Kinetic Kudu

Ubuntu 22.10, codenamed Kinetic Kudu, was released on 20 October 2022. It uses Linux kernel 5.19, which improves the power efficiency on Intel-based computers and supports multithreaded decompression. It also upgrades to GNOME 43, which introduces quick settings in the top-right corner, replaces PulseAudio–its default audio server–with PipeWire, adds support for MicroPython on microcontrollers such as the Raspberry Pi Pico W, and adds support for RISC-V processors. rshell, thonny, and mpremote were added to the Ubuntu repositories.

=== Ubuntu 23.04 (Lunar Lobster) ===
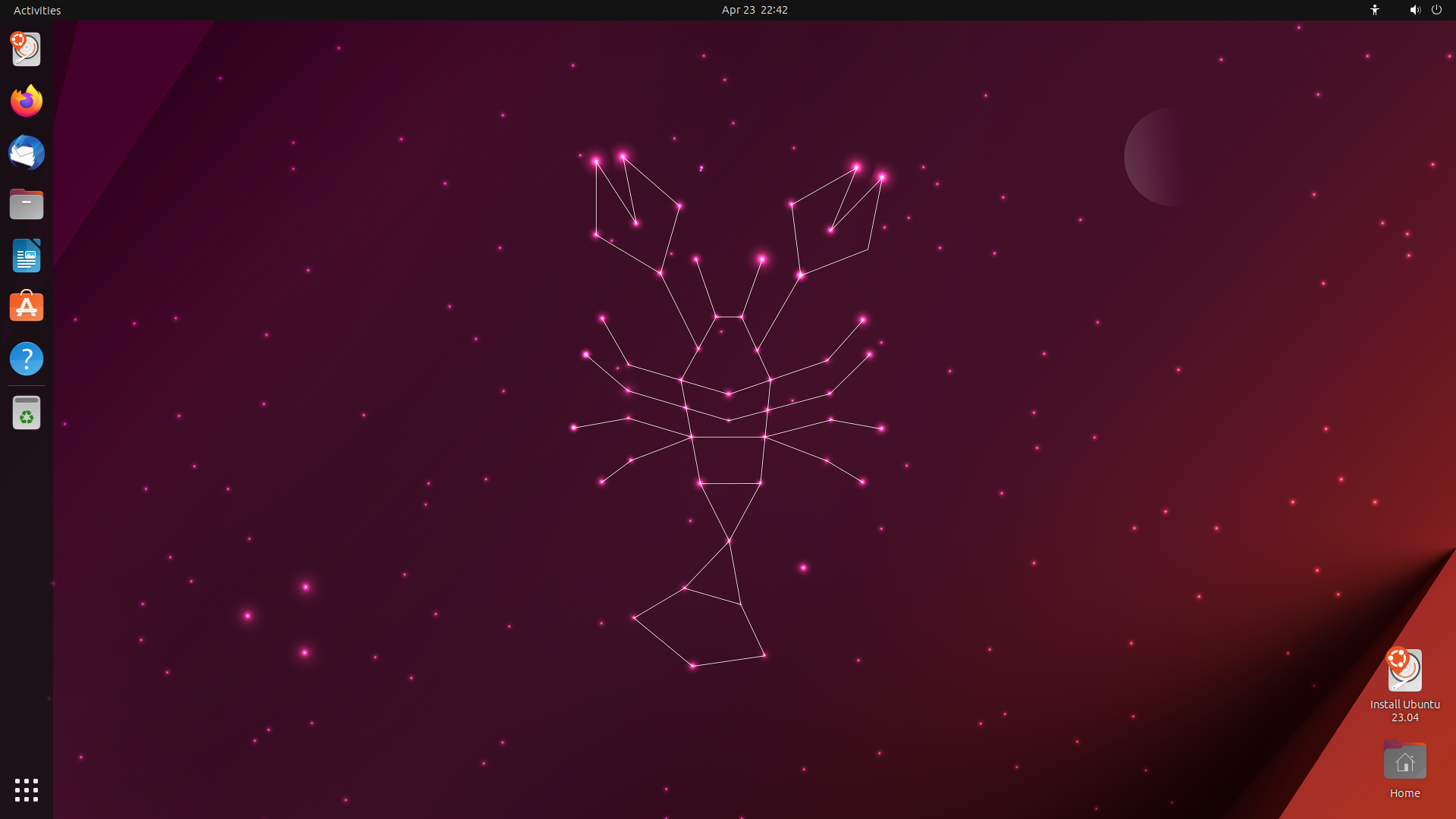
Ubuntu 23.04 Lunar Lobster

Ubuntu 23.04 Lunar Lobster is an interim release, released on 20 April 2023 and supported for nine months until 20 January 2024. This release incorporates GNOME 44, Linux kernel 6.2, Mesa 23.0 graphics drivers, a new Flutter-based installer, an improved Quick Settings menu, a new Mouse & Touchpad menu in Settings, improved Snap package startup times, and improved Snap package support that allows downloading open applications in the background and installing them when the application is closed. The release also provides support for Microsoft Azure Active Directory (a.k.a. Entra ID), which allows users with Microsoft 365 Enterprise plans to authenticate the Ubuntu desktops using common credentials. The default font has been updated to be slimmer and sharper. Reviewer Joey Sneddon of OMG! Ubuntu wrote, "if you asked me to describe Ubuntu 23.04 in one word I'd choose: "improvement". Nothing in this release is revolutionary – but that's not a bad thing."

=== Ubuntu 23.10 (Mantic Minotaur) ===
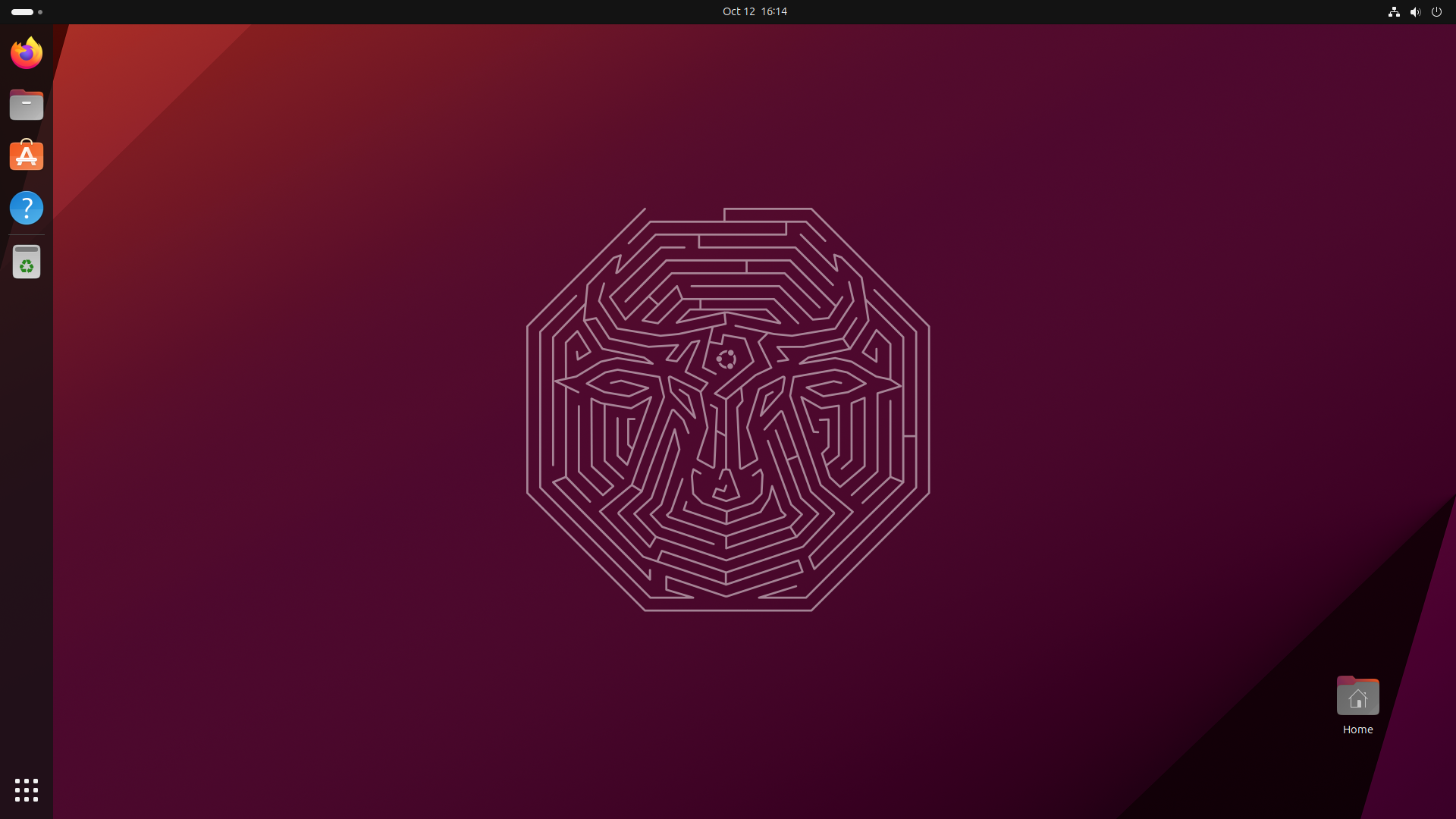
Ubuntu 23.10 Mantic Minotaur

Ubuntu 23.10 Mantic Minotaur is an interim release, originally released on 12 October 2023, and supported for nine months until July 2024. This release incorporates a new App Center built in Flutter that replaces Ubuntu Software, TPM disk encryption, a separated firmware updater, Netplan as the default network configuration tool, and support for Raspberry Pi 5. The installer can now update itself, support guided ZFS installation, and defaults to a minimal installation, which doesn't include apps deemed non-essential such as LibreOffice, Mozilla Thunderbird, Rhythmbox, and Calendar. Out-of-the-box support for installing .deb package files graphically was removed; however, the dialog for choosing an alternative app to open the file still recommended opening with the App Center. This would lead to uproar when the behavior was left unchanged in the next release.

This version also includes an upgrade to GNOME 45, which replaces the top-left corner's app name display with an indicator of the workspace being used, adds a camera usage indicator, a new camera app named "Snapshot", and a new image viewer app. Sidebars are now as tall as their windows as part of design polishing.

Approximately 6 hours after release, the download link to Ubuntu 23.10 was removed due to hate speech in an externally-sourced Ukrainian translation of the installer. Downloads were restored 4 days later.

=== Ubuntu 24.04 LTS (Noble Numbat) ===
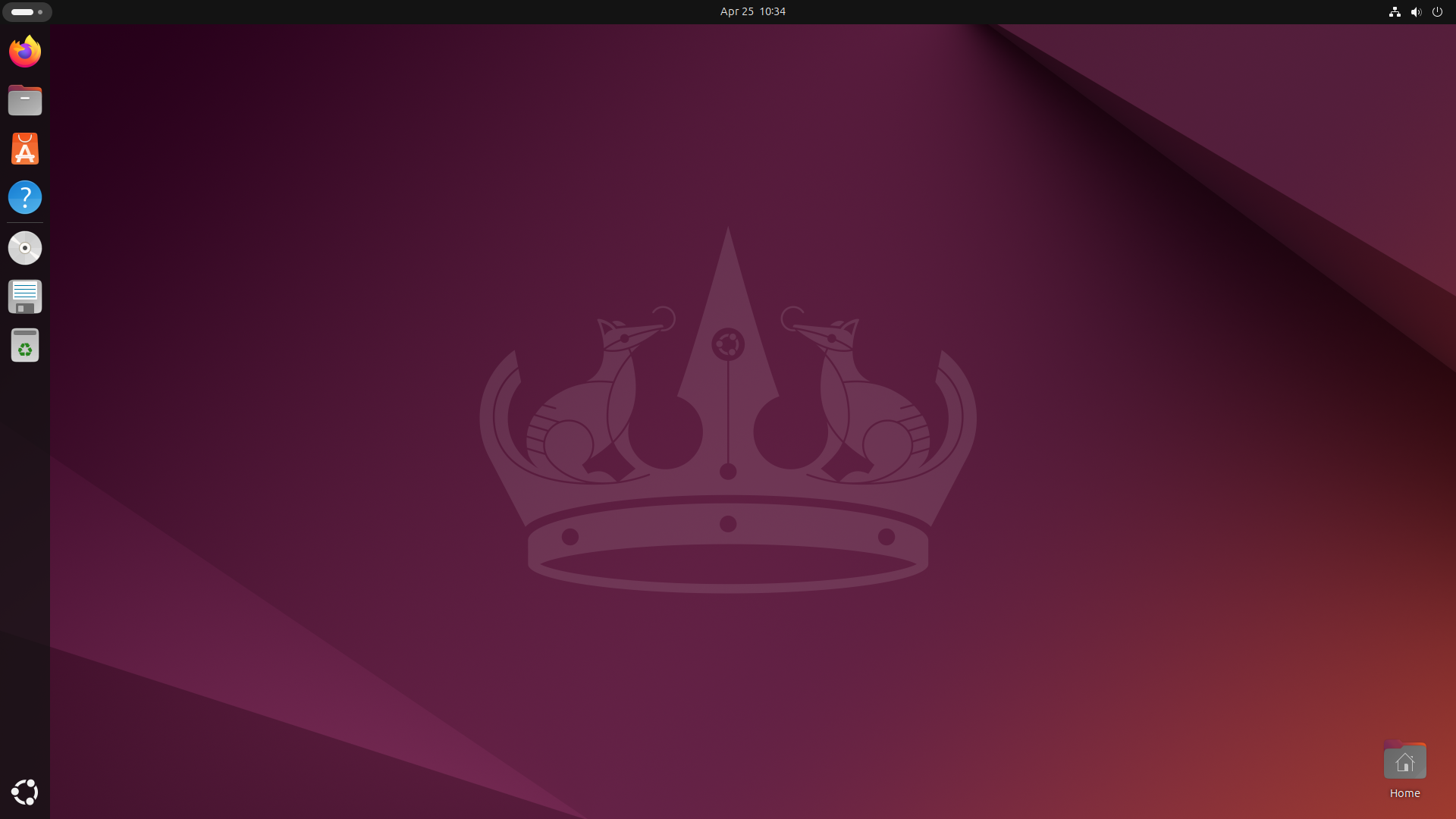
Ubuntu 24.04 LTS Noble Numbat

Ubuntu 24.04 Noble Numbat is a long-term support release that was released on 25 April 2024. It is based on systemd v255.4 and Linux kernel 6.8, which includes support for more gamepads and better swap memory handling. Raspberry Pi users no longer need to install its own package for bluetooth support, and the year 2038 problem has been patched for 32-bit armhf systems, which will no longer have their own images in future major releases. The release coincides with the release of Netplan v1.0, the default network configuration tool since 23.10. System image size has been reduced by 200 MB.

As part of an upgrade to GNOME 46, many apps have been updated to use libadwaita and GTK4. Nautilus, the file manager, has received several quality-of-life features, and Wi-Fi settings now include an option to generate a QR code for network credentials. Notifications now include a header for the sender app's name, settings have been reorganized, touch users now tap to click by default, and users can now log in from a remote desktop.

Cheese, a Photo Booth-like camera app, has been replaced by GNOME Snapshot in the extended install, and GNOME Games is now never bundled on install. Thunderbird is now provided as only its snap version.

Abishek of It's Foss News strongly criticized the LTS release for not changing behavior from 23.10, the last release, that by default made users unable to graphically install .deb packages, the most popular format for distributing software. Combined with the App Center, a recommended application to open the package with, freezing when attempting to open a .deb file, along with .deb's being opened with the archive extractor by default in 20.04, he argued that this was indicative of Canonical resorting to sabotaging user experience to promote their own products—in this case, snap packages. Conversely, It's Foss praised other aspects of the release as "a near-perfect upgrade". By July 15, the App Center received the ability to install .deb packages (while providing a warning), though they still cannot be managed even if installed from the App Center's store.

=== Ubuntu 24.10 (Oracular Oriole) ===
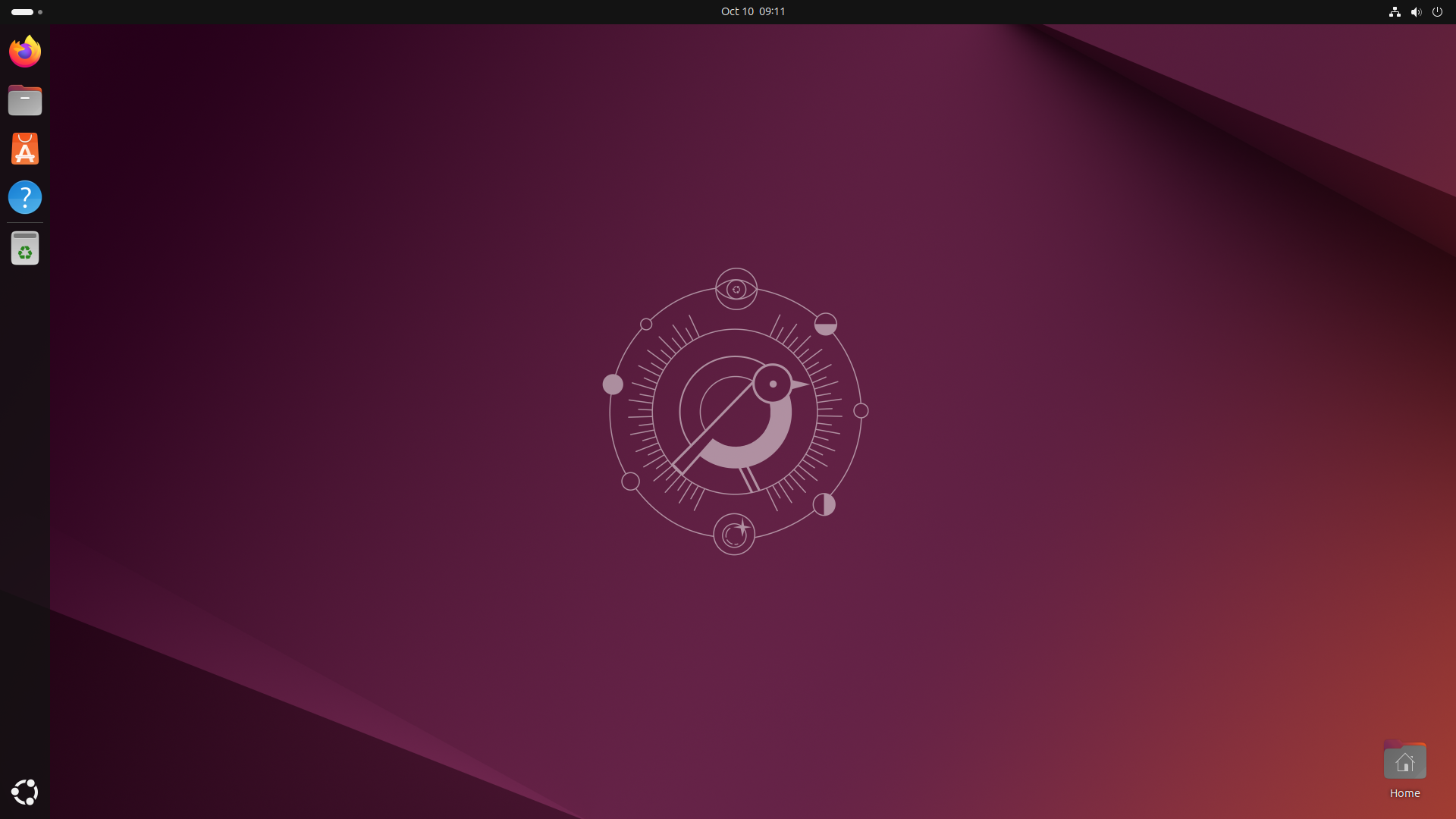
Ubuntu 24.10 Oracular Oriole

Ubuntu 24.10 Oracular Oriole is an interim release, released on 10 October 2024, marking the 20th anniversary of the Ubuntu project; to commemorate, the release includes a selectable retro theme (wallpaper, accent color, and startup sound). Ubuntu's GNOME customizations were moved to a separate Settings section, a Security Center was added that features fine-grained app-by-app permissions control, the dock shows progress bars for updates to snap apps, and the App Center now supports graphically installing DEB files. The release uses Wayland by default on Nvidia GPUs and ships GNOME 47.

On 9 August 2024, Ubuntu announced a change in policy to always use the latest upstream version of the Linux kernel—even if said version is a release candidate instead of a stable release, as long as it is past its merge window—at the time of each kernel freeze, which is now two weeks before the release date.

=== Ubuntu 25.04 (Plucky Puffin) ===
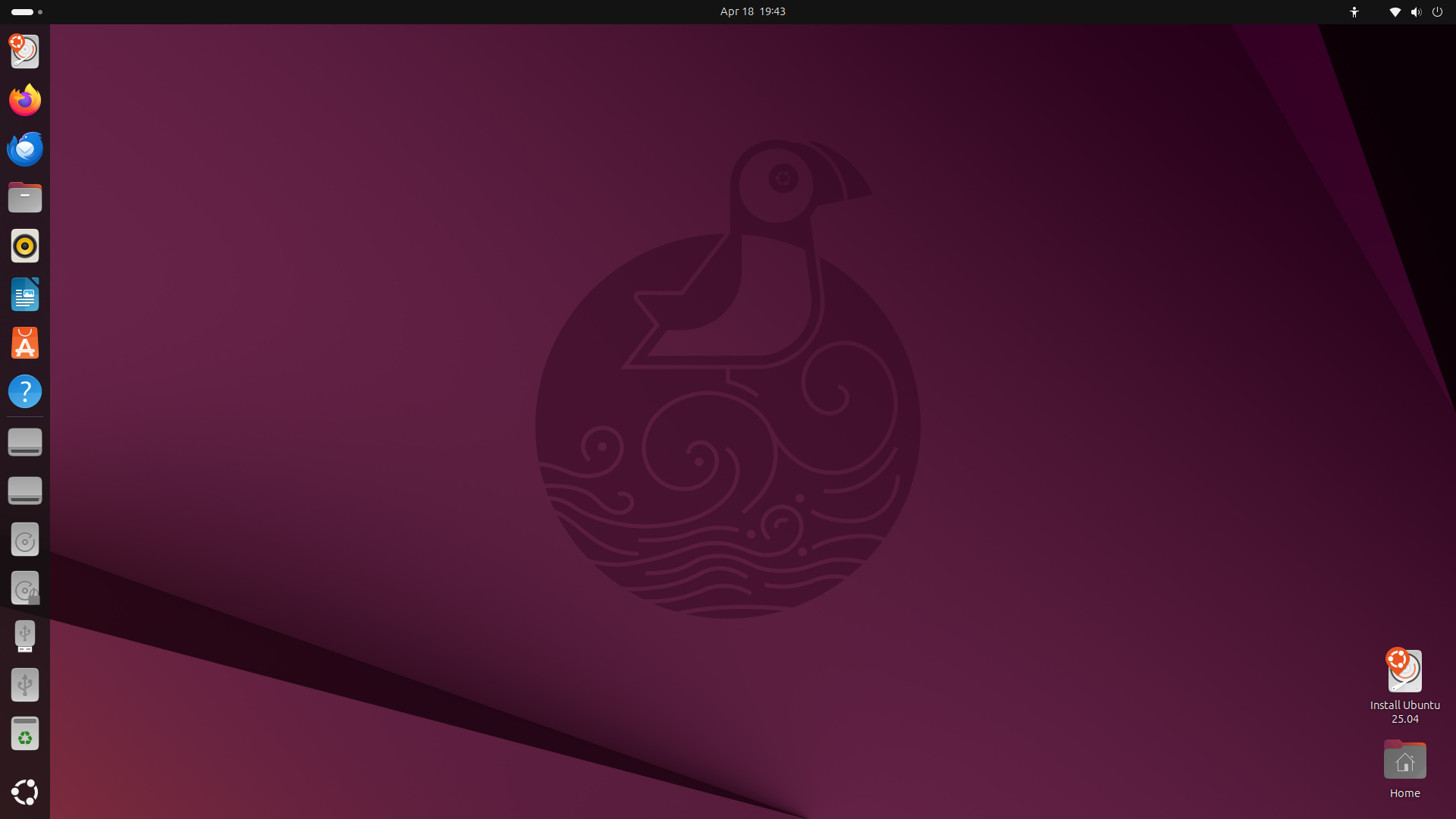
Ubuntu 25.04 Plucky Puffin

Ubuntu 25.04 Plucky Puffin was released on 17 April 2025 and ships Linux 6.14 and GNOME 48, which includes notification grouping; "Wellbeing", a screen time and limits management feature; battery charge limits powered by UPower; HDR support; and the replacement of Evince with its GTK 4 fork Papers as the default document viewer. Additionally, it includes JPEG XL support by default and replaces the archived Mozilla Location Service with beaconDB.

=== Ubuntu 25.10 (Questing Quokka) ===
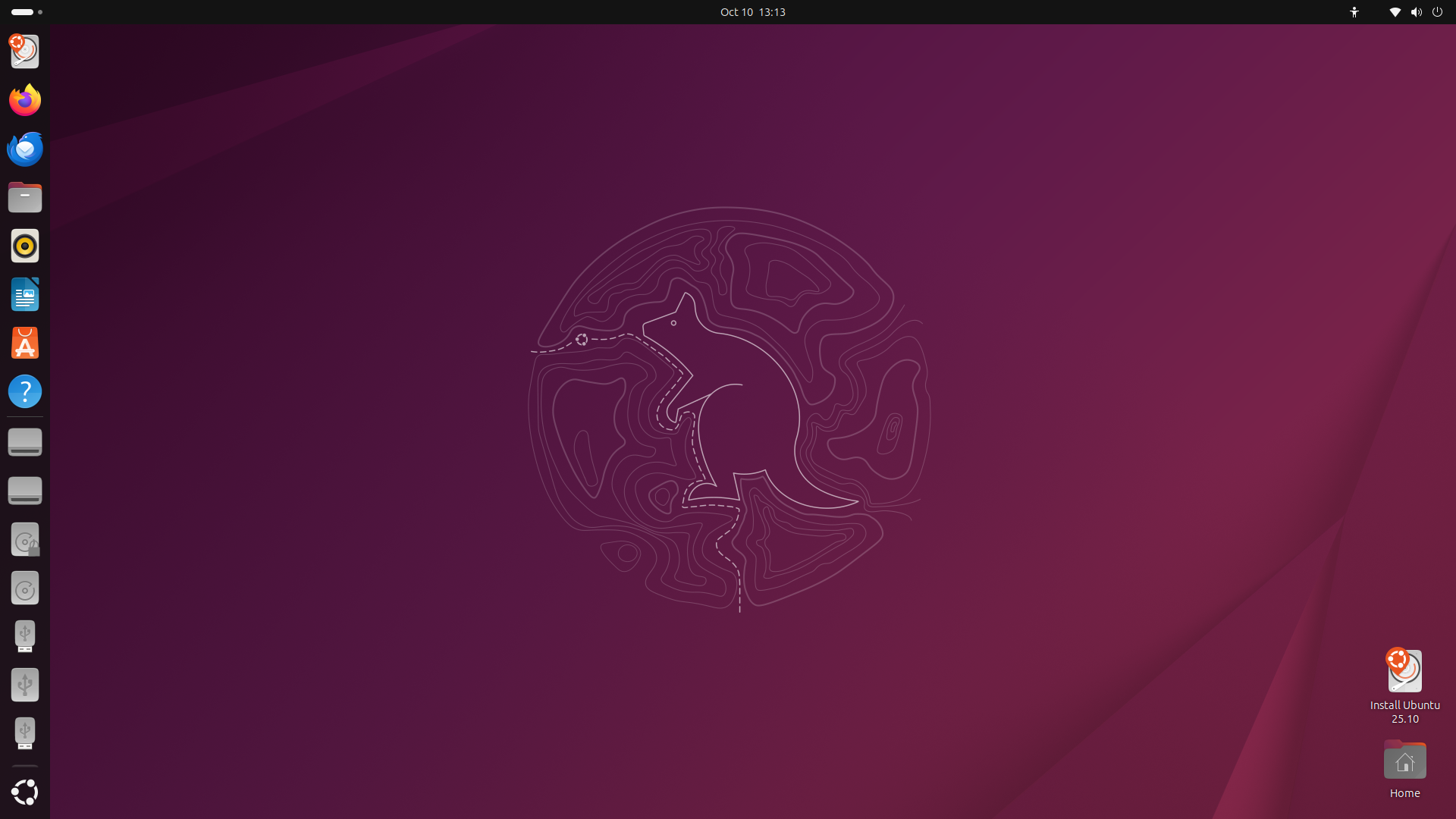
Ubuntu 25.10 Questing Quokka

Ubuntu 25.10 Questing Quokka was released on 9 October 2025. Update notification is now done through a notification and tray applet instead of a window that steals input focus; Ubuntu plans to work on a different solution when Wayland protocols allow for better control of the window to focus. Icons on the desktop now have improved keyboard navigation and screenreader announcements. TPM-backed full-disk encryption has been added as an experimental installer option along with support in Firmware Updater and Security Center. A new boot spinner fixes distracting visual glitches, and the dock icon outline now aligns with the edge of the dock, shipped along with updates to the default Yaru theme (including a new trash can).

The release adopts Dracut for initramfs generation, chrony for time synchronization, and Rust rewrites of fundamental command-line utilities: sudo-rs for sudo and rust-coreutils to replace GNU Core Utilities. APT 3.1 is customized to include the upcoming history-related features as an "easter egg"—without documentation. In a push to cut down on size, wget was removed from the default server install in favor of wcurl, as well as Byobu and GNU Screen in favor of tmux. The Raspberry Pi image is now consistent with the "minimal" software set option in the desktop installer and uses a backup and boot-testing mechanism to improve booting reliability in a new process dubbed "tryboot". For RISC-V processors, the release raises profile requirements to RVA23, which was not implemented in any on-market hardware as of 9 October.

Ptyxis replaces GNOME Terminal as the default terminal emulator, providing container and remote connection support along with performance improvements. Loupe replaces Eye of GNOME as the default image viewer. Ubuntu 25.10 incorporates GNOME 49, which disables the X11 session by default, adds accessibility tools and media controls to the lock screen, changes fractional scaling calculation to sharpen rendering on high-res displays, implements pointer wrap, supports variable–refresh-rate cursors, and removes the "Startup Applications" app in favor of a settings panel; OMG! Ubuntu expressed annoyance at being unable to run custom commands at login with the new interface.

Initially, Ubuntu 25.10 could not install flatpaks due to an AppArmor issue. This was fixed on 15 October. Some Ubuntu 25.10 systems could not automatically check for software updates due to a bug in rust-coreutils's version of the date command fixed on 22 October. Manual updates such as updates done through the apt command were not affected.

=== Ubuntu 26.04 LTS (Resolute Raccoon) ===
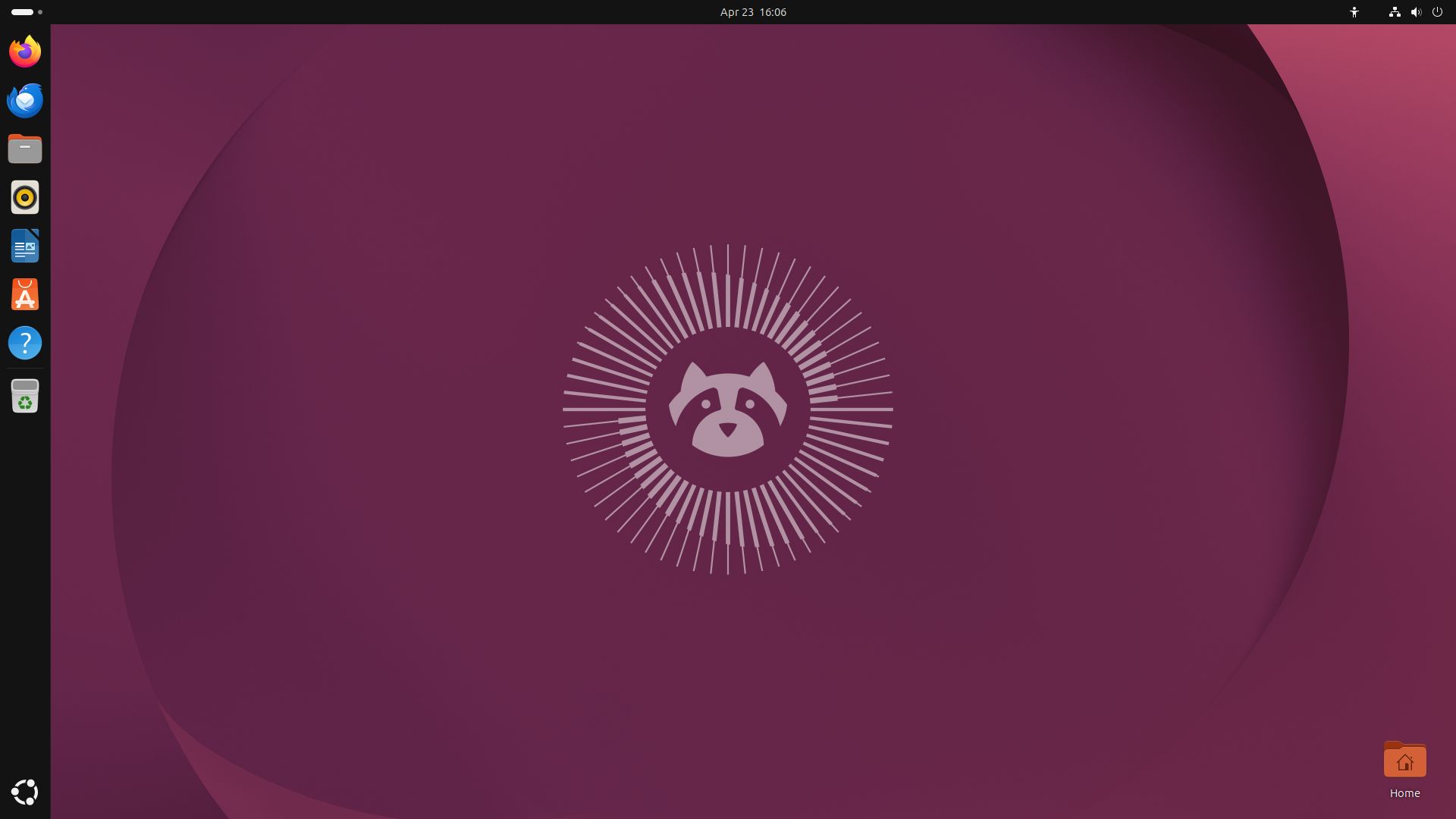
Ubuntu 26.04 LTS Resolute Raccoon

Ubuntu 26.04 Resolute Raccoon was released on 23 April 2026 and users were officially allowed to upgrade from 25.10 on 14 May. 24.04 LTS installations were expected to be able to upgrade in August with the release of 26.04.1. The codename was selected by and as a tribute to the Debian and Ubuntu release manager, Steve Langasek, before his death.

This version incorporates Linux 7.0 and GNOME 50, which removed support for Xorg/X11. Recommended system requirements were raised to 6 GB RAM to reflect typical workloads. Sudo was configured to show asterisks when typing by default. The desktop UI was updated with greater contrast and consistency, more colorful folder icons, and a new boot animation inspired by the Resolute Raccoon mascot. Showtime replaced Totem video player, and Resources replaces System Monitor and Power Statistics. Global search can now search for available Snap applications and the web. Software & Updates, which manages package repositories, was dropped from the default installation; Ubuntu Pro status is now managed by Security Center, along with disk encryption.

=== Ubuntu 26.10 (Stonking Stingray) ===
Ubuntu 26.10, codenamed "Stonking Stingray", is a release of the Ubuntu operating system launched on October 15, 2026. This version provides support for a period of 9 months, ending in July 2027.

End-User and Desktop Features

The release places a strong emphasis on the everyday user experience, incorporating the GNOME 51 desktop environment, which offers smoother and more responsive performance. New conveniences include remembering monitor brightness across reboots, automatic screen rotation, and an option to automatically disable the touchpad when an external mouse is connected. The Files application now provides a count when dragging and dropping multiple files and groups file notifications, while the Calendar app uses less data during synchronization. Additionally, the Papers application now allows users to add visual signatures to documents.

Window management has been improved with the introduction of a new popup that offers tiling layout options when dragging a window. Significant additions have also been made to accessibility, including expanding the Reduced Motion setting, enhancements to the Orca screen reader, and the ability to adjust screenshot selections via the keyboard. Furthermore, the system includes new "Stonking Stingray" wallpapers, which were selected through a community competition.

The App Center has been significantly upgraded, now providing a unified view for application details that presents Snap and Debian package information together. A dedicated page for managing drivers (such as NVIDIA graphics drivers) has also been added, and the ability to automatically install multimedia codecs exactly when they are needed for playback has been introduced. An innovative addition is "Myna", an experimental speech-to-text tool that runs strictly locally on the computer without sending data over the internet.

System, Security, and Hardware Support

Ubuntu 26.10 is based on the Linux 7.3 kernel and introduces major architectural changes, such as replacing the default dbus-daemon inter-process communication bus with the more modern dbus-broker. Also, core system utilities (coreutils) now run exclusively via the uutils implementation, which is written in the Rust programming language. The software provides upgraded development tools, such as GCC 15.2.0, Python 3.14.7, and OpenJDK 25.0.4, as well as updated server applications like MySQL 9.7 LTS.

In the area of security, the system has been upgraded to OpenSSL 4 and integrates Sequoia PGP (a modern OpenPGP implementation written in Rust) as a more memory-safe option. Full disk encryption (FDE) backed by TPM is now permitted even on computers lacking a hardware root of trust, provided a PIN or passphrase is set. Regarding hardware, the release brings official support for new RISC-V platforms (such as the SpacemiT K3 boards) and adds support for new laptops based on Snapdragon processors (including Snapdragon X2 Elite, X Elite, and X Plus). Finally, the Settings application can now display whether the computer is officially certified for Ubuntu.

=== Ubuntu 27.04 (Tenacious T-Rex) ===
Canonical revealed the codename for Ubuntu 27.04 on 13 October 2026, and it is officially “Tenacious T-Rex”.

== Table of versions ==
Table of Ubuntu versions
Version	Code name	Release date	Standard support until	Extended security maintenance until	Legacy Add-On Coverage until	Initial kernel version
4.10	Warty Warthog	2004-10-20	2006-04-30	—N/a	—N/a	2.6.8
5.04	Hoary Hedgehog	2005-04-08	2006-10-31	—N/a	—N/a	2.6.10
5.10	Breezy Badger	2005-10-12	2007-04-13	—N/a	—N/a	2.6.12
6.06 LTS	Dapper Drake	2006-06-01	2009-07-14 (Note: 2011-06-01 for Ubuntu 6.06 LTS Server)	—N/a	—N/a	2.6.15
6.10	Edgy Eft	2006-10-26	2008-04-25	—N/a	—N/a	2.6.17
7.04	Feisty Fawn	2007-04-19	2008-10-19	—N/a	—N/a	2.6.20
7.10	Gutsy Gibbon	2007-10-18	2009-04-18	—N/a	—N/a	2.6.22
8.04 LTS	Hardy Heron	2008-04-24	2011-05-12 (Note: 2013-05-09 for Ubuntu 8.04 LTS Server)	—N/a	—N/a	2.6.24
8.10	Intrepid Ibex	2008-10-30	2010-04-30	—N/a	—N/a	2.6.27
9.04	Jaunty Jackalope	2009-04-23	2010-10-23	—N/a	—N/a	2.6.28
9.10	Karmic Koala	2009-10-29	2011-04-30	—N/a	—N/a	2.6.31
10.04 LTS	Lucid Lynx	2010-04-29	2013-05-09 (Note: 2015-04-30 for Ubuntu 10.04 LTS Server)	—N/a	—N/a	2.6.32
10.10	Maverick Meerkat	2010-10-10	2012-04-10	—N/a	—N/a	2.6.35
11.04	Natty Narwhal	2011-04-28	2012-10-28	—N/a	—N/a	2.6.38
11.10	Oneiric Ocelot	2011-10-13	2013-05-09	—N/a	—N/a	3.0
12.04 LTS	Precise Pangolin	2012-04-26	2017-04-28	2019-04-26	—N/a	3.2
12.10	Quantal Quetzal	2012-10-18	2014-05-16	—N/a	—N/a	3.5
13.04	Raring Ringtail	2013-04-25	2014-01-27	—N/a	—N/a	3.8
13.10	Saucy Salamander	2013-10-17	2014-07-17	—N/a	—N/a	3.11
14.04 LTS	Trusty Tahr	2014-04-17	2019-04-25	2024-04-25	2029-04-25	3.13
14.10	Utopic Unicorn	2014-10-23	2015-07-23	—N/a	—N/a	3.16
15.04	Vivid Vervet	2015-04-23	2016-02-04	—N/a	—N/a	3.19
15.10	Wily Werewolf	2015-10-22	2016-07-28	—N/a	—N/a	4.2
16.04 LTS	Xenial Xerus	2016-04-21	2021-04-30	2026-04-23	2031-04-23	4.4
16.10	Yakkety Yak	2016-10-13	2017-07-20	—N/a	—N/a	4.8
17.04	Zesty Zapus	2017-04-13	2018-01-13	—N/a	—N/a	4.10
17.10	Artful Aardvark	2017-10-19	2018-07-19	—N/a	—N/a	4.13
18.04 LTS	Bionic Beaver	2018-04-26	2023-05-31	2028-04-26	2033-04-26	4.15
18.10	Cosmic Cuttlefish	2018-10-18	2019-07-18	—N/a	—N/a	4.18
19.04	Disco Dingo	2019-04-18	2020-01-23	—N/a	—N/a	5.0
19.10	Eoan Ermine	2019-10-17	2020-07-17	—N/a	—N/a	5.3
20.04 LTS	Focal Fossa	2020-04-23	2025-05-29	2030-04-23	2035-04-23	5.4
20.10	Groovy Gorilla	2020-10-22	2021-07-22	—N/a	—N/a	5.8
21.04	Hirsute Hippo	2021-04-22	2022-01-20	—N/a	—N/a	5.11
21.10	Impish Indri	2021-10-14	2022-07-14	—N/a	—N/a	5.13
22.04 LTS	Jammy Jellyfish	2022-04-21	2027-06-01	2032-04-21	2037-04-21	5.15 or 5.17
22.10	Kinetic Kudu	2022-10-20	2023-07-20	—N/a	—N/a	5.19
23.04	Lunar Lobster	2023-04-20	2024-01-25	—N/a	—N/a	6.2
23.10	Mantic Minotaur	2023-10-12	2024-07-11	—N/a	—N/a	6.5
24.04 LTS	Noble Numbat	2024-04-25	2029-05-31	2034-04-25	2039-04-25	6.8
24.10	Oracular Oriole	2024-10-10	2025-07-10	—N/a	—N/a	6.11
25.04	Plucky Puffin	2025-04-17	2026-01-15	—N/a	—N/a	6.14
25.10	Questing Quokka	2025-10-09	2026-07-09	—N/a	—N/a	6.17
26.04 LTS	Resolute Raccoon	2026-04-23	2031-05-29	2036-04-23	2041-04-23	7.0 (Note: Announced as 6.20.)
26.10	Stonking Stingray	2026-10-15	2027-07-15	—N/a	—N/a	7.3-rc6
27.04	Tenacious T-Rex	2027-04-22	2028-01-20	—N/a	—N/a	TBA
Legend: Unsupported Supported Latest version Preview version Future version

== See also ==
- Debian release version history
- Fedora Linux release history
- openSUSE version history
- Linux kernel version history
