= List of largest hourglasses =

This article lists the largest hourglasses that have been built.

Image	Info	Duration
	Constructed in 2000 by a group of smiths, this hourglass is located in Ybbsitz, Austria, and is called Panta Rhei.	
	Built in 1984 and located in Mainz, Germany, this hourglass was donated by Schott glass works.	1 hour
	The BMW Hourglass, a 12-metre sculpture, was unveiled in 2008 in Red Square in Moscow, Russia as a promotion for a BMW car model; 180,000 silver balls drained from the upper bulb to reveal the car.	2 days
	Called Timewheel, this hourglass is located near Hősök tere in Budapest, Hungary and was unveiled in 2004 in commemoration of Hungary's accession to the EU.	1 year
	Built in 1991 and located in the Nima Sand Museum in Ōda, Japan, this hourglass is the largest in the world; it is 5.2 metres high and contains around one ton of sand.	1 year
	Built in 1999 and located near the beach in Jeongdongjin, South Korea; it takes one year for the sand to fall to the bottom.	1 year
	A two-metre high hourglass, filled with artificial blood, was installed in 2007 at Downing Street in London, UK as part of a protest demanding British intervention in the Darfur conflict.	
	In 2009, the government of Brazil installed a number of large hourglasses in major cities to mark the enacting of an anti-smoking law.	
	Filled with ground ivory, this hourglass was on display in 2005–06 at the Merseyside Maritime Museum in Liverpool and the At-Bristol Science Centre in Bristol, UK, to highlight the at-risk status of elephants.	
