= Timewheel =

Monument in Budapest, Hungary

Coordinates: 47°30′46.05″N 19°4′48.98″E

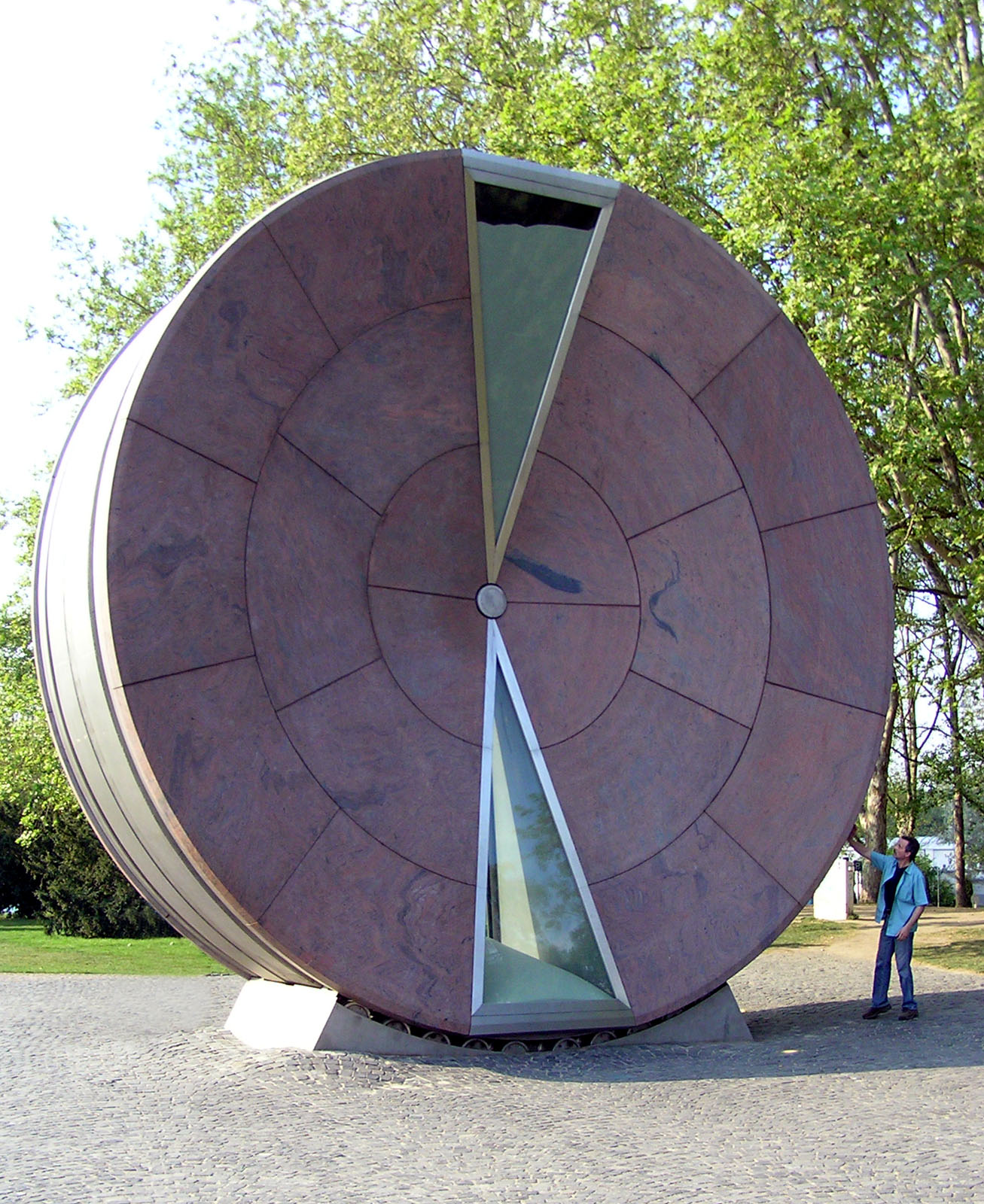
The Timewheel (Időkerék)

The Timewheel (Hungarian: Időkerék) is a large hourglass, situated in Budapest next to City Park, right of Heroes' Square and behind the Palace of Art (Műcsarnok), on the site of a former statue of Lenin that now stands in Memento Park. It is made of granite, steel, and glass, and weighs 60 tons. The sand, which consists of glass granules, flows from the upper to the lower glass chamber over the course of one year.

The sand runs out on New Year's Eve and the Timewheel is then turned 180 degrees so the flow of the sand can resume for the next year. The turning is accomplished by four people pulling cables, and takes roughly 45 minutes to complete. The Timewheel was unveiled on 1 May 2004 to commemorate the historic enlargement of the European Union that admitted Hungary (along with nine other countries) to the EU.

János Herner designed and built the Timewheel after an architectural design done by István Janáky.

== See also ==
- List of largest hourglasses
