= Heroes' Square (Budapest) =

UNESCO World Heritage Site
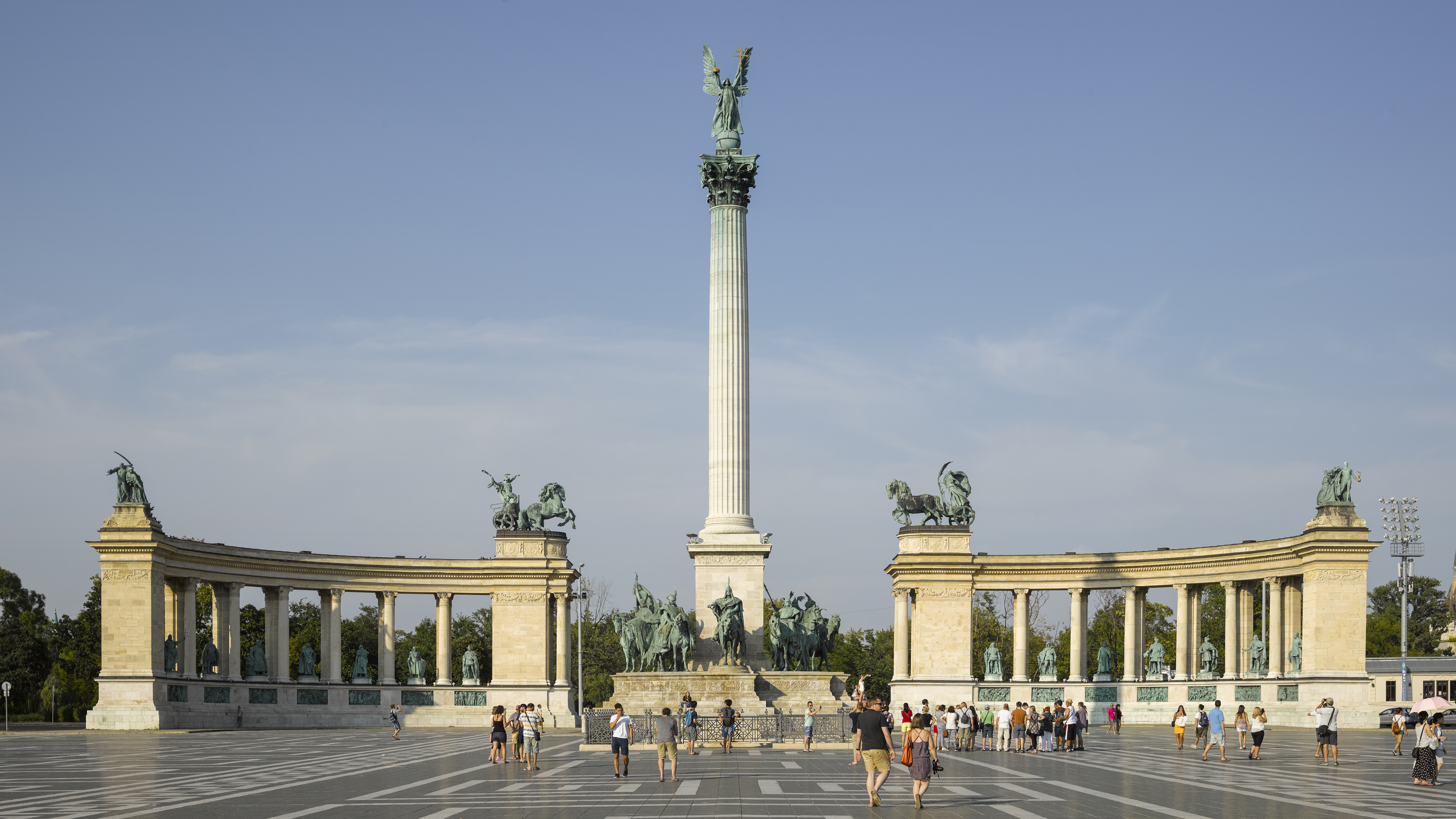
- Heroes' Square – overview

- Location within Budapest Location within Hungary
- Location: Zugló, Budapest, Hungary
- Part of: "Andrássy Avenue and the Underground" part of Budapest, including the Banks of the Danube, the Buda Castle Quarter and Andrássy Avenue
- Criteria: Cultural: (ii)(iv)
- Reference: 400bis-002
- Inscription: 1987 (11th Session)
- Extensions: 2002
- Coordinates: 47°30′54″N 19°4′40″E

Heroes' Square (Hungarian: Hősök tere, pronounced [ˈhøːʃøk ˈtɛrɛ]) is one of the major squares in Budapest, Hungary, noted for its iconic Millennium Monument (Hungarian: Millenáriumi Emlékmű) with statues featuring the Seven chieftains of the Magyars and other important Hungarian monarchs and national leaders, as well as the Memorial Stone of Heroes (Hungarian: Hősök emlékköve), often erroneously referred as the Tomb of the Unknown Soldier.

Some of the statues of the monument were replaced several times up until the middle of the 20th century, reflecting the political climate of the time. Heroes' Square was shaped by each political system in its own way, but its role and meaning remained the same. It hosted official and alternative political events and commemorations. As part of the World Heritage together with Andrássy Avenue, it became a national memorial site.

It has been officially called Heroes' Square since 1932. The square lies at the outbound end of Andrássy Avenue next to City Park. It hosts the Museum of Fine Arts and the Hall of Art.

In Budapest there are three more squares named Hősök tere, 'Heroes' Square', in the districts or neighbourhoods of Soroksár, Békásmegyer and Rákosliget.

== History and outlook ==
Heroes' Square is surrounded by two important buildings, the Museum of Fine Arts on the left and thr Hall of Art on the right. On the other side it faces Andrássy Avenue, which has two buildings facing the square – one is residential and the other one is the embassy of Serbia (former Yugoslav embassy where Imre Nagy secured sanctuary in 1956).

The central feature of Heroes' Square, as well as a landmark of Budapest, is the Millennium Memorial. Construction began in 1896 to commemorate the thousandth anniversary of the Hungarian conquest of the Carpathian Basin and the foundation of the Hungarian state in 896, and was part of a much larger construction project which also included the expansion and refurbishing of Andrássy Avenue and the construction of the first metro line in Budapest. Construction was mostly completed in 1900, which was when the square received its name.

During the late 19th century, in the period of Hungarian nation-building, the creation of a monument that would also serve as a national pantheon was of particular importance. Lively debates arose over which figures from Hungarian history should be admitted, cast in bronze, to the Millennial pantheon. The plans approved in 1897 listed the following kings and rulers for the statues in the two-part colonnade: Saint Stephen, Saint Ladislaus, Coloman the Learned, Andrew II, Béla IV, Charles Robert, Louis the Great, Matthias Corvinus, John Szapolyai, Ferdinand I, Charles III, Maria Theresa, Leopold II, and Franz Joseph I. The design was later amended to include John Hunyadi as the only figure who was not depicted as a king, replacing John Szapolyai, who was considered less illustrious in the context of Hungary's national past. By the time the monument was inaugurated in 1905, only five of the planned statues had been completed.

Although the original commission for the sculptural work was awarded solely to György Zala, he ultimately produced the statues of the rulers with the assistance of several other artists: Károly Senyei, Ede Telcs, Richárd Füredi, Miklós Köllő, György Kiss, Ede Margó, Barnabás Holló, and György Vastagh. György Zala first completed the 4.8 m-high bronze statue of the Archangel Gabriel, holding the Holy Crown of Hungary and the Apostolic Double Cross. The work was awarded the Grand Prix at the 1900 Paris Exposition. In 1901, the angel statue was installed atop the 36 m-high Corinthian column at the center of the Millennium Monument. At the foot of the column, the statue of Grand Prince Árpád, as well as those of the chieftains of the Hungarian conquest, were also created by György Zala. He was responsible for two of the statues of kings, Louis the Great and Matthias Corvinus, as well as the allegorical statues of War and Peace, Labour and Wealth, and Knowledge and Glory.

When the monument was constructed, the Kingdom of Hungary was a part of the Austro-Hungarian Empire and the last 5 statues on the left colonnade were reserved for members of the ruling Habsburg dynasty. King Ferdinand I (relief: Defense of the Castle of Eger in 1552), King Charles III (relief: Eugene of Savoy defeats the Turks at Battle of Zenta in 1697), Queen Maria Theresa (relief: The Hungarian Diet votes support for Maria Theresa with their vow ("Our lives and our blood!") in 1741), King Leopold II (relief: The return of the Holy Crown of Hungary to Buda in 1790), and King Franz Joseph (relief: Franz Joseph crowned by Prime Minsiter Gyula Andrássy, the much-loved Hungarian Queen Elisabeth also appears, and Ferenc Deák, the Hungarian statesman who played a leading role in the Austro-Hungarian Compromise of 1867).

During the 133 days of the Hungarian Soviet Republic, the 5 statues of the Habsburg rulers were removed from the monument, and on 1 May 1919, the entire composition was draped in red fabric. The statue of Archangel Gabriel was replaced by a huge red obelisk, with a 7 m-high plaster sculpture group featuring Karl Marx placed in front of it, hiding the statue of Grand Prince Árpád.

During the Horthy era, the statues of the rulers were restored. The statue of Franz Joseph, which had been destroyed during the Hungarian Soviet Republic, was recreated. However, instead of showing the emperor in a hussar general's uniform, the new statue depicted him wearing his coronation robe.

It was officially named Heroes' Square in 1932.

During World War II and the Soviet siege of Budapest, the statues of Queen Maria Theresa and King Leopold II were destroyed. After the war, the statues of Árpád and the Hungarian chieftains were restored. The statues of the Habsburg rulers were replaced with statues of key figures from Hungary's struggles for independence and freedom. Some of these statues had originally been donated to Budapest by Franz Joseph, the former Habsburg ruler himself. In 1954–55, in line with the Communists' people's and independence-oriented interpretation, which portrayed Hungarian history and the process of class struggle as a series of national struggles for freedom, statues of Imre Thököly, Francis II Rákóczi, and Lajos Kossuth were placed among the remaining statues of Hungarian kings.

Heroes' Square also provided the setting for a symbolic event of Hungary's peaceful democratic transition: the reburial of Imre Nagy on 16 June 1989.

At the front of the monument is the Memorial Stone of Heroes, a large stone cenotaph surrounded by ornamental iron railings. The cenotaph is dedicated "To the memory of the heroes who gave their lives for the freedom of our people and our national independence." While some guide books refer to this as a tomb it is not a burial place but is erroneously referred as the "Tomb of the Unknown Soldier". Hungary has no Tomb of the Unknown Soldier unlike most European countries, nor any memorial to the unknown fallen of wars. No human remnants are interred here, there is only an artesian well under the tombstone-like memorial. The Memorial Stone of Heroes was originally erected in 1929 as a tribute to those who died defending Hungary's 1000-year-old borders. It was removed in 1951 as its message was politically unacceptable for the Communist regime. The current one was built at the same spot in 1956. The memorial is surrounded by a fence and it is off limits for visitors. The Ministry of Defence only opens the gate for foreign dignitaries and official state ceremonies.

Behind the cenotaph but within the decorative railings is a flat bronze plate which marks the site of an artesian well whose drilling was completed in 1878 by Vilmos Zsigmondy. This well provides water for the Széchenyi thermal bath behind the monument and the Dagály Baths in the Népfürdő utca. The well reached a depth of 971 meters and produces 831 liters of hot water per minute at 74 degrees Celsius.

The Heroes' Square monument has a 90% duplicate in Shanghai Global Paradise, Shanghai. Since its opening in 1996, it has been mostly degraded and most statues removed.

In 2024, for the first time in more than 120 years, the monumental statue of Archangel Gabriel was removed from the Corinthian column of the Millennium Monument for restoration.

== Gallery ==
=== Statues of the column of the Millennium Monument ===
The 4.8 m-high bronze statue of Archangel Gabriel atop the 36 m-high Corinthian column at the center of the Millennium Monument. In his right hand the angel holds the Holy Crown of Hungary, the Crown of Saint Stephen, the first king of Hungary. In his left hand the angel holds a two-barred apostolic cross, a symbol awarded to St. Stephen by the Pope in recognition of his efforts to convert Hungary to Christianity. In Hungarian it is referred to as the double cross or the apostolic double cross.

At the base of the column is a group of seven mounted figures representing the Magyar chieftains who led the Hungarian people into the Carpathian basin. In the front is Árpád, considered to be the founder of the Hungarian nation. Behind him are the chieftains Előd, Ond, Kond, Tas, Huba, and Töhötöm (Tétény). Little survives in the historical record about these individuals and both their costumes and their horses are considered to be more fanciful than historically accurate.

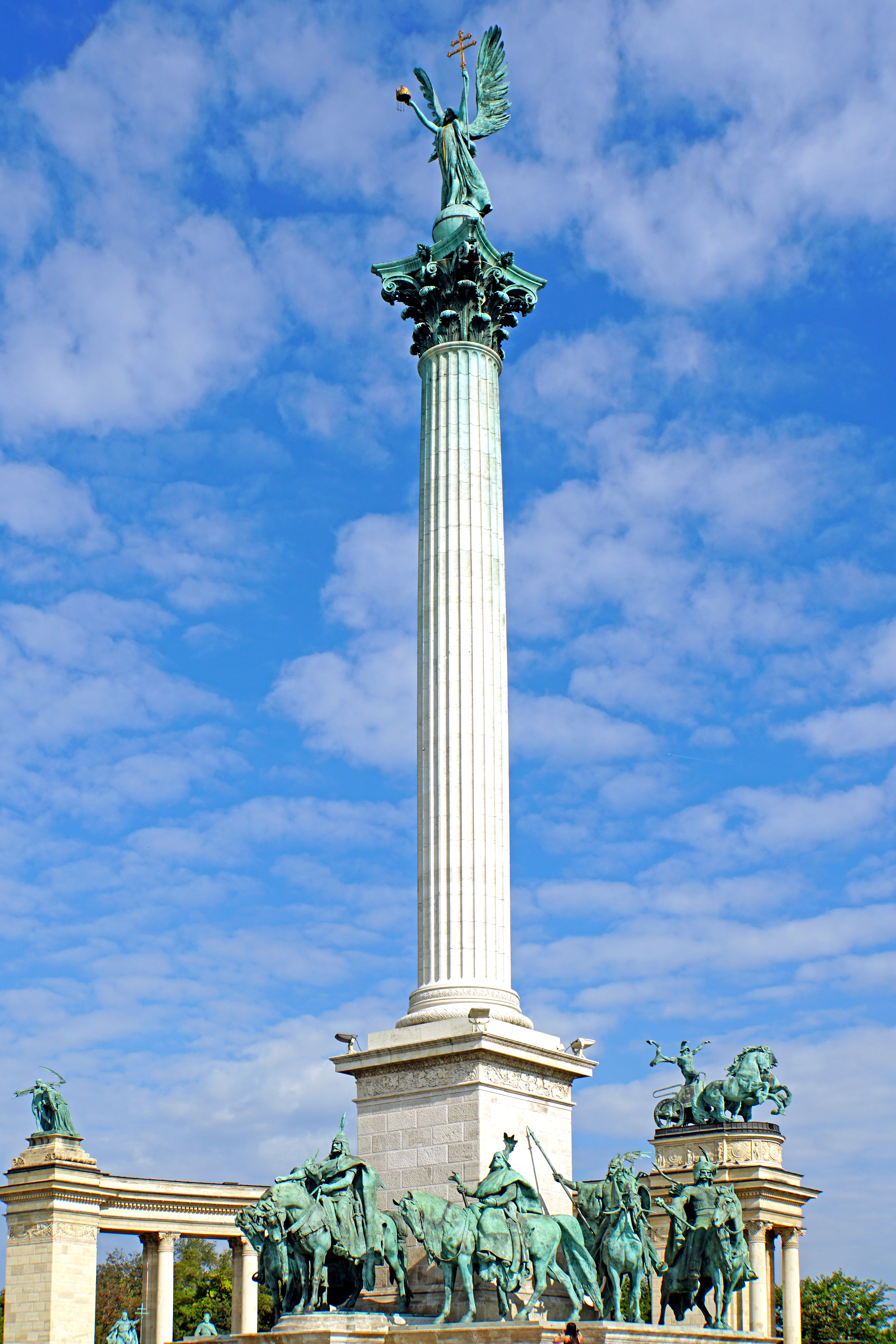
The column

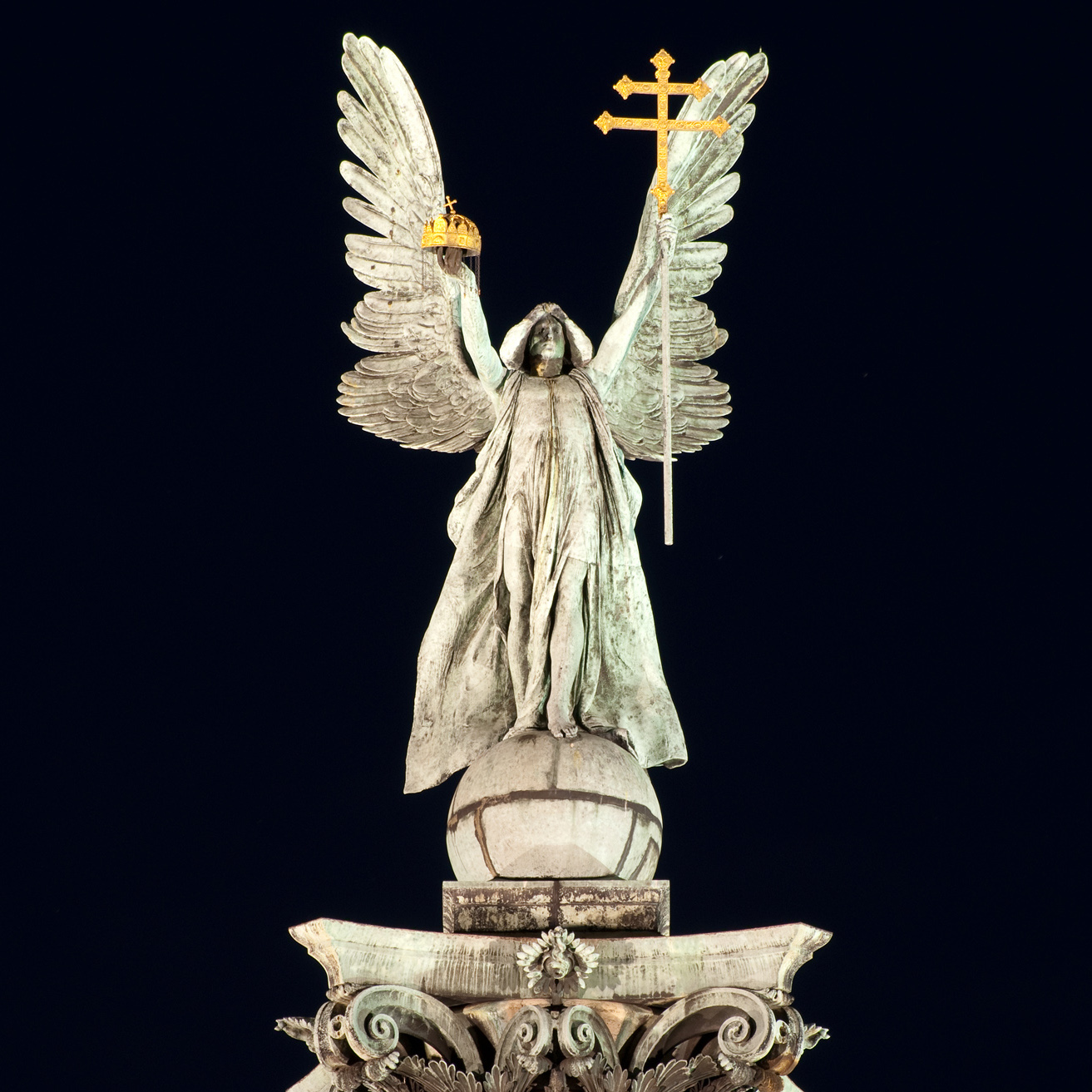
At the top of the column stands Archangel Gabriel, holding the Holy Crown of Hungary and the Apostolic Double Cross

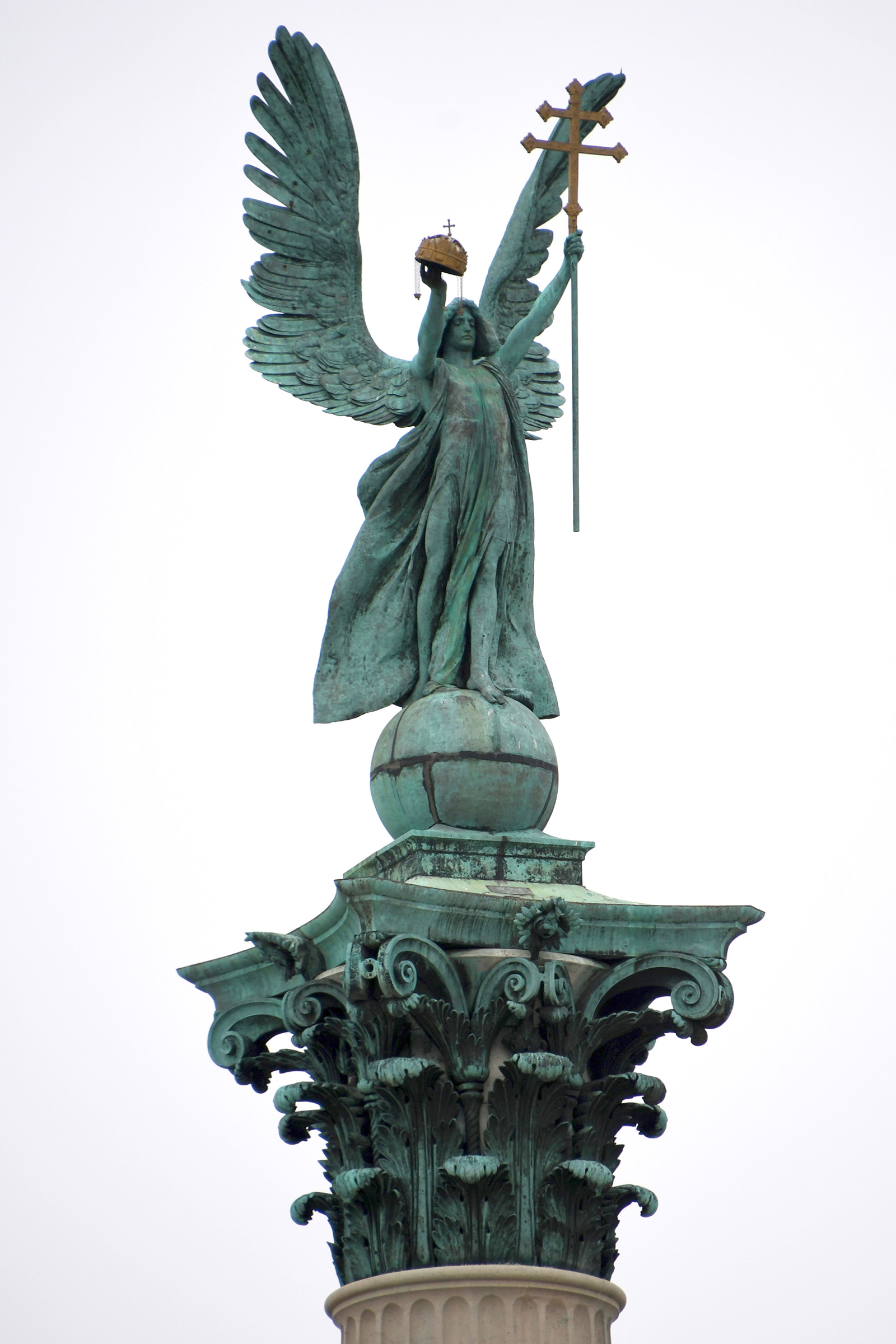
The bronze statue of Archangel Gabriel

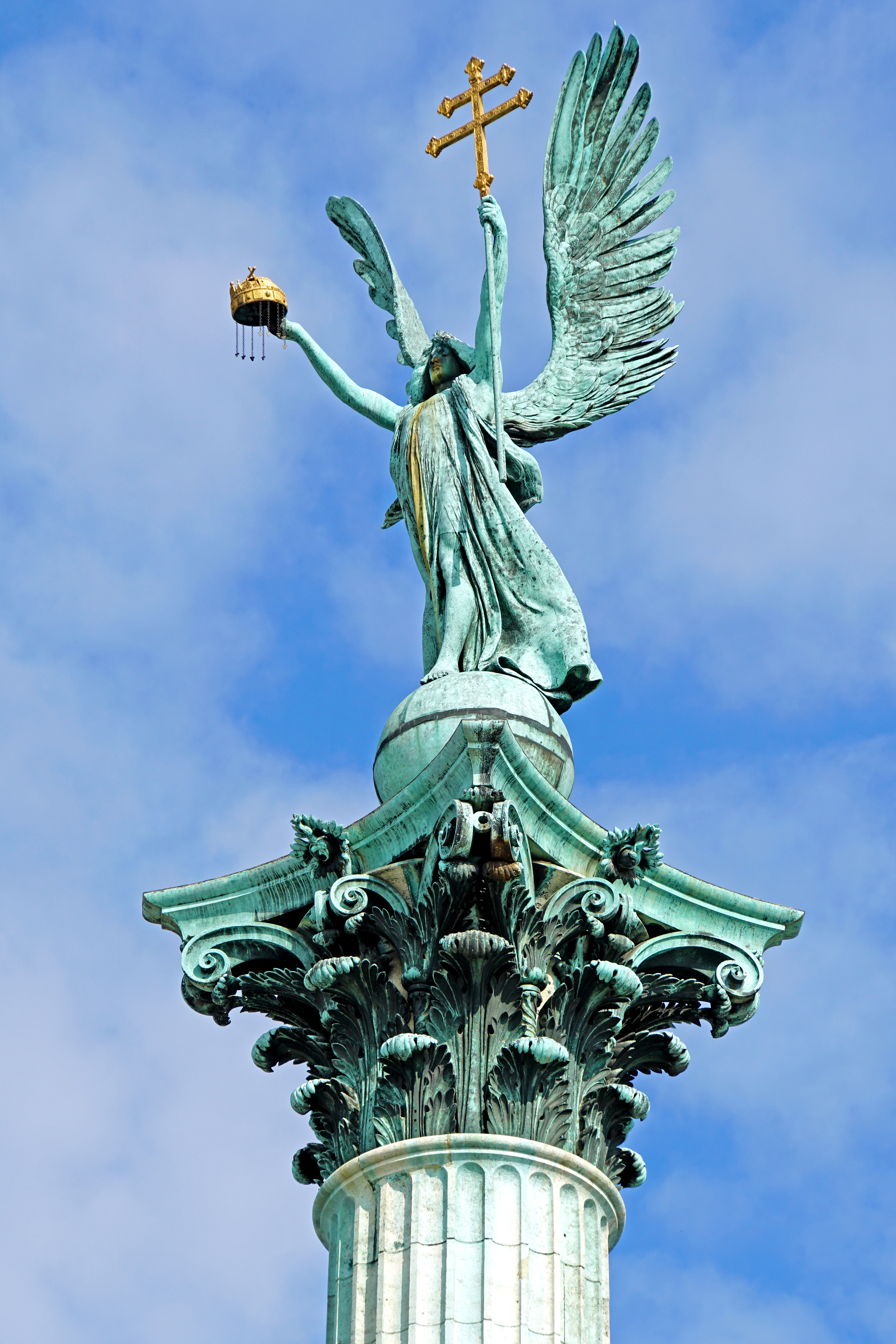
Archangel Gabriel

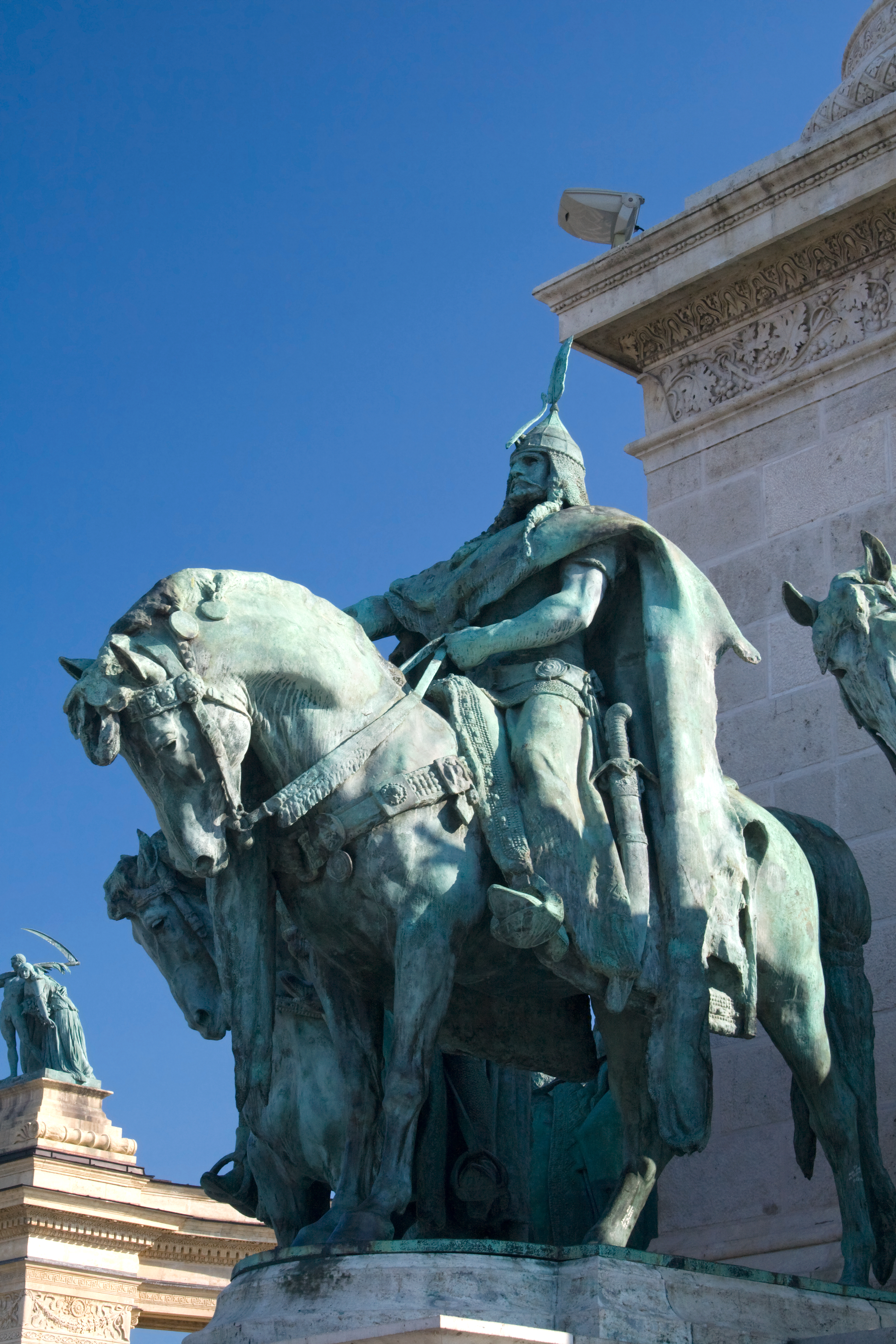
Statue of Grand Prince Árpád on front of the column

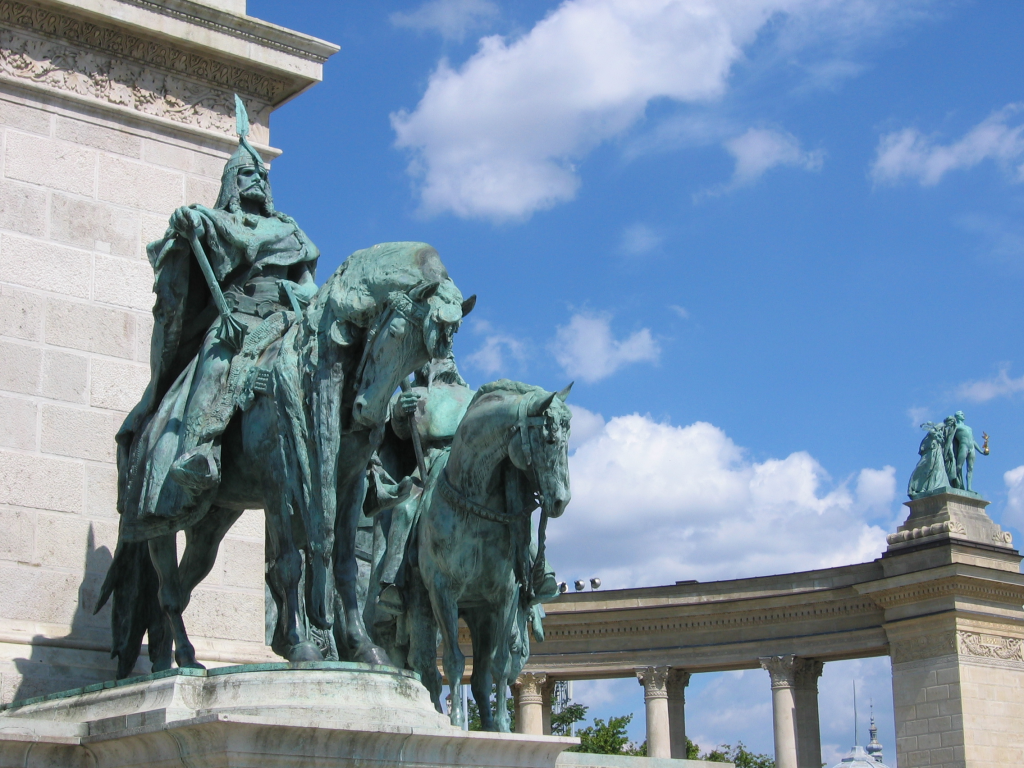
Statue of Grand Prince Árpád on front of the column

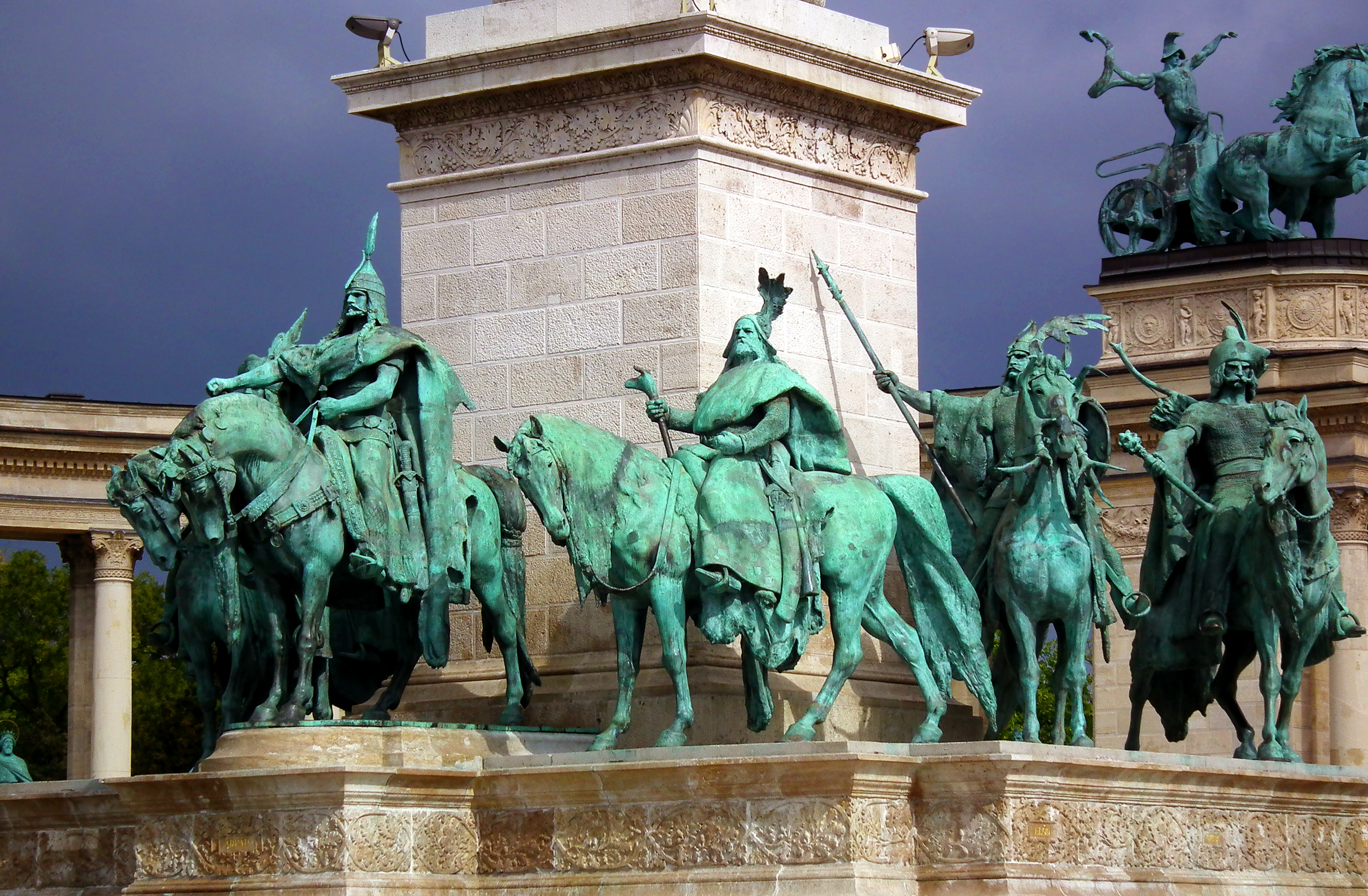
Statues of the Seven chieftains of the Magyars around the column

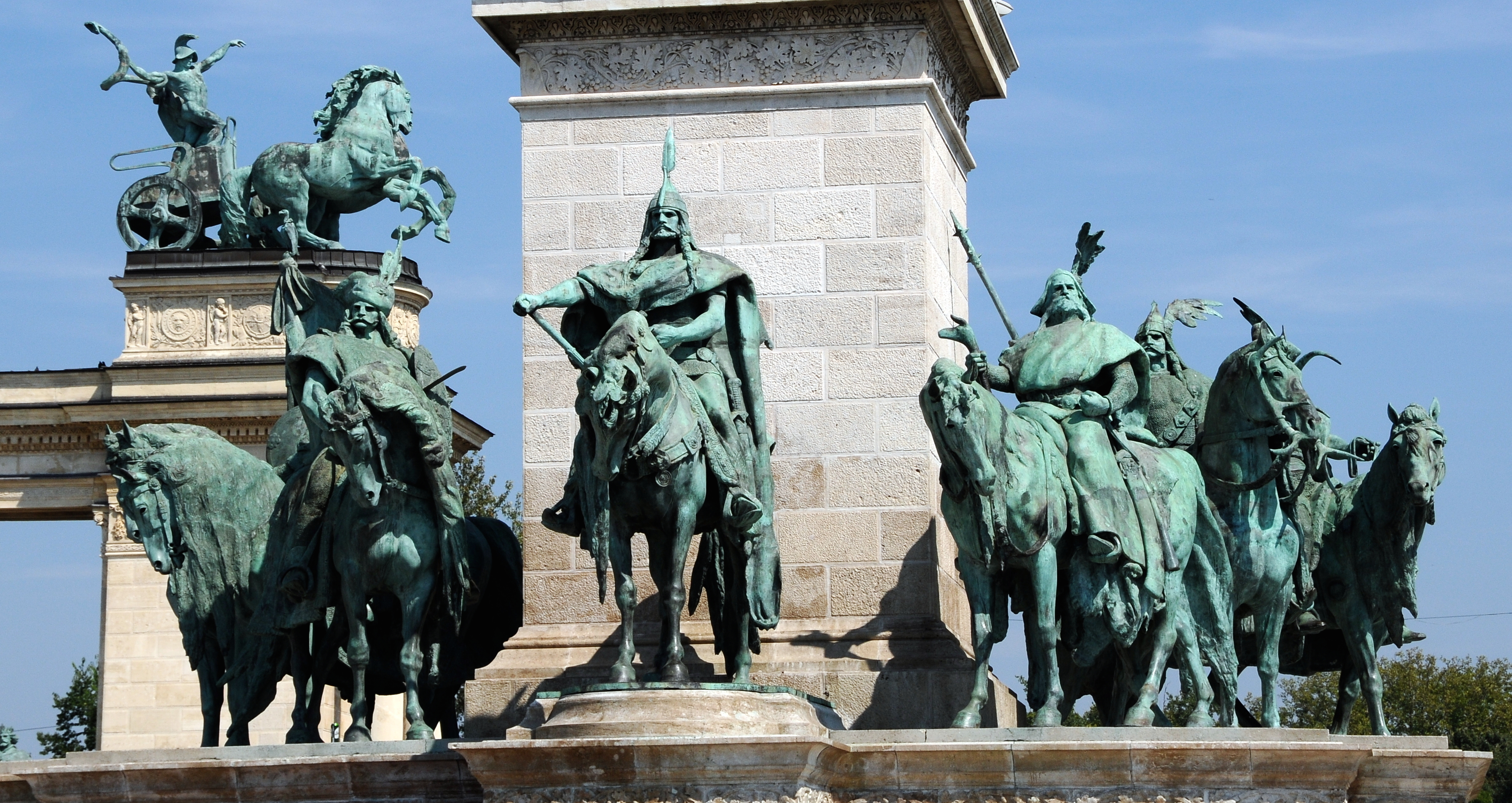
Statues of the Seven chieftains of the Magyars around the column

=== Statues of the left colonnade of the Millennium Monument ===
Topping the outer (left) edge of the left colonnade is a statue of a man with a scythe and a woman sowing seed, representing Labour and Wealth. At the inner (right) end of the left colonnade, is a male figure driving a chariot using a snake as a whip and representing War.

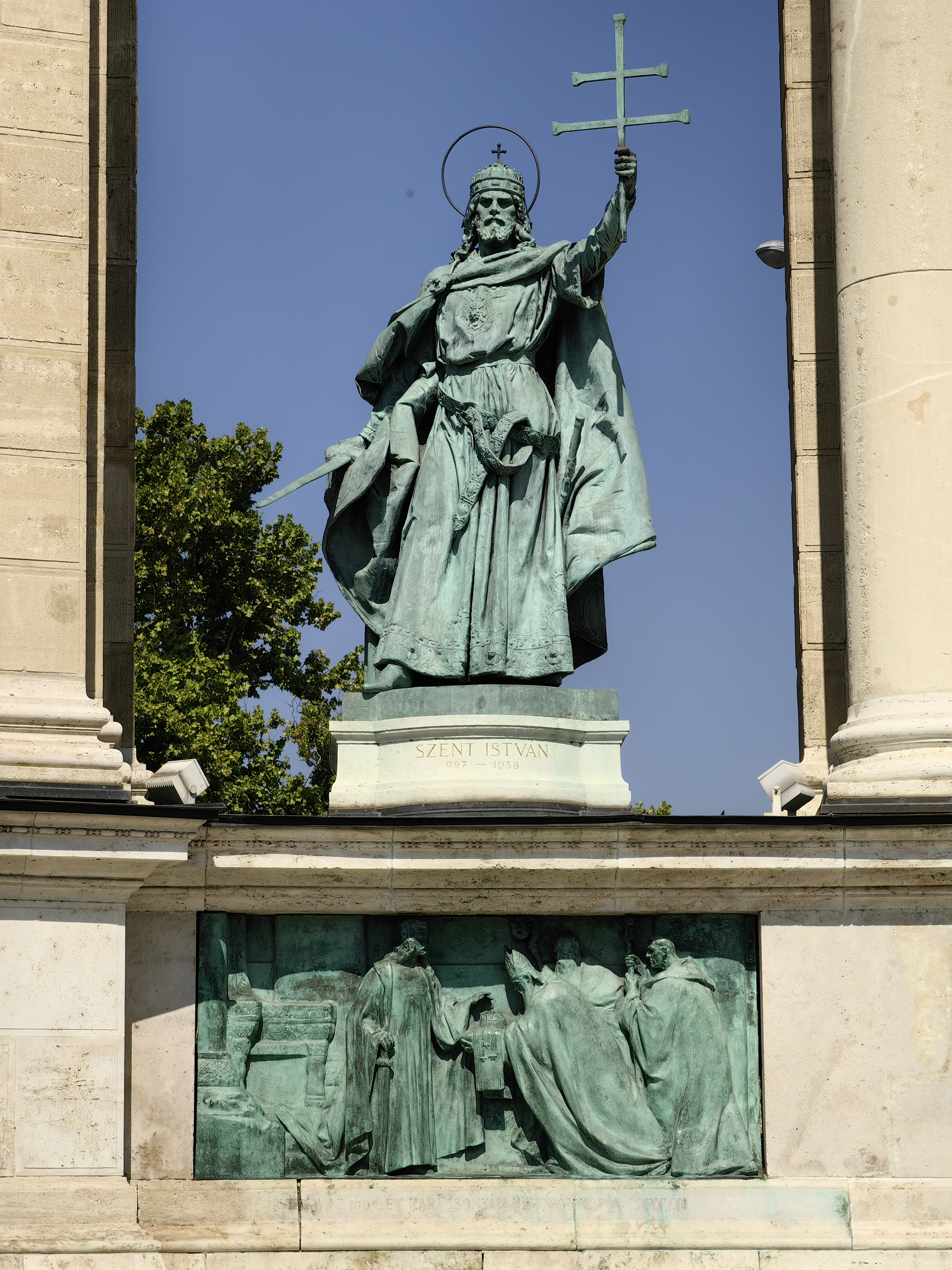
King Stephen I of Hungary. Relief: Saint Stephen receives the Holy Crown from the Pope (1000).

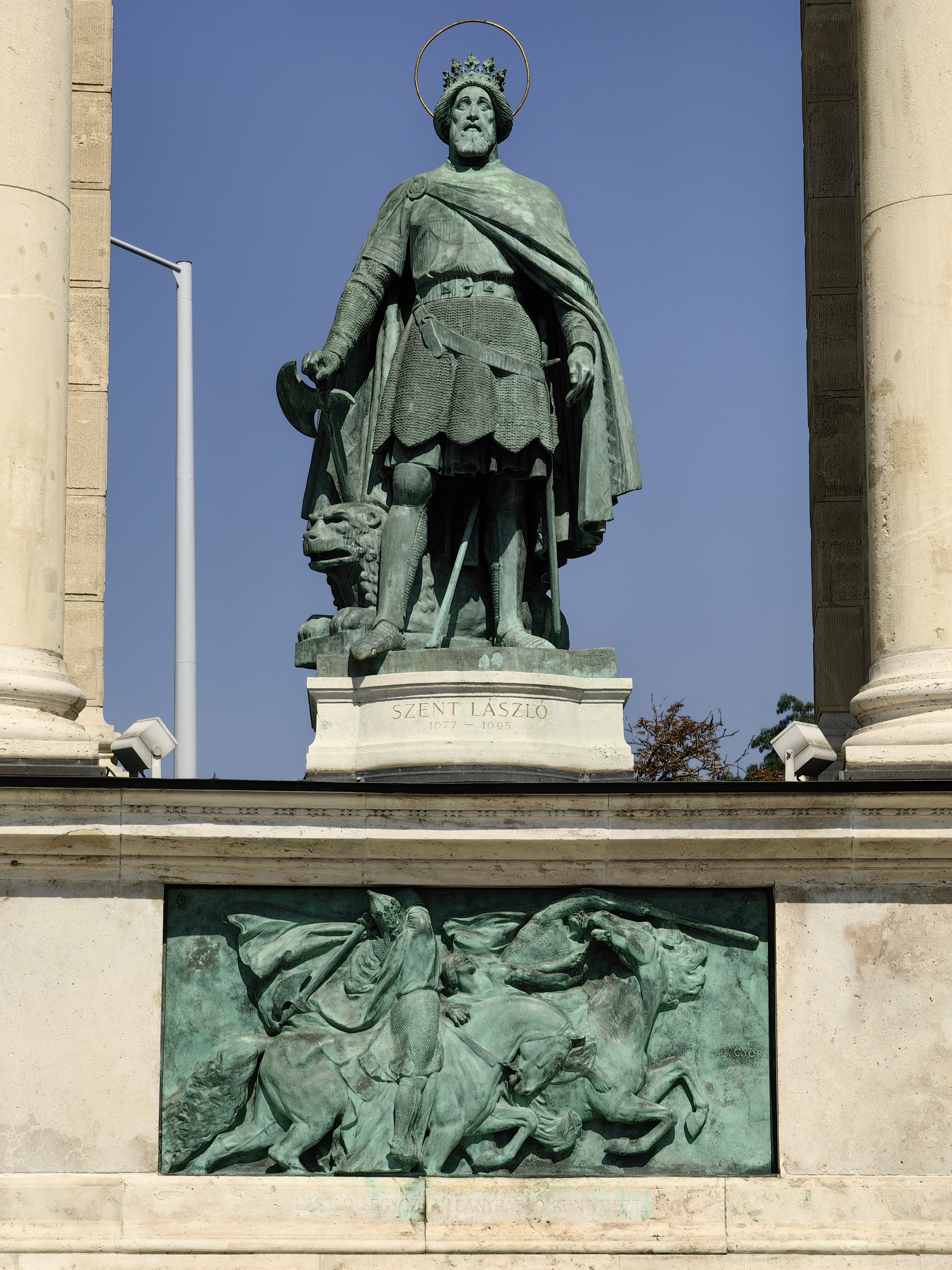
King Ladislaus I of Hungary. Relief: Saint Ladislaus defeats the Cuman warrior who abducted a girl (Battle of Kerlés, 1068).

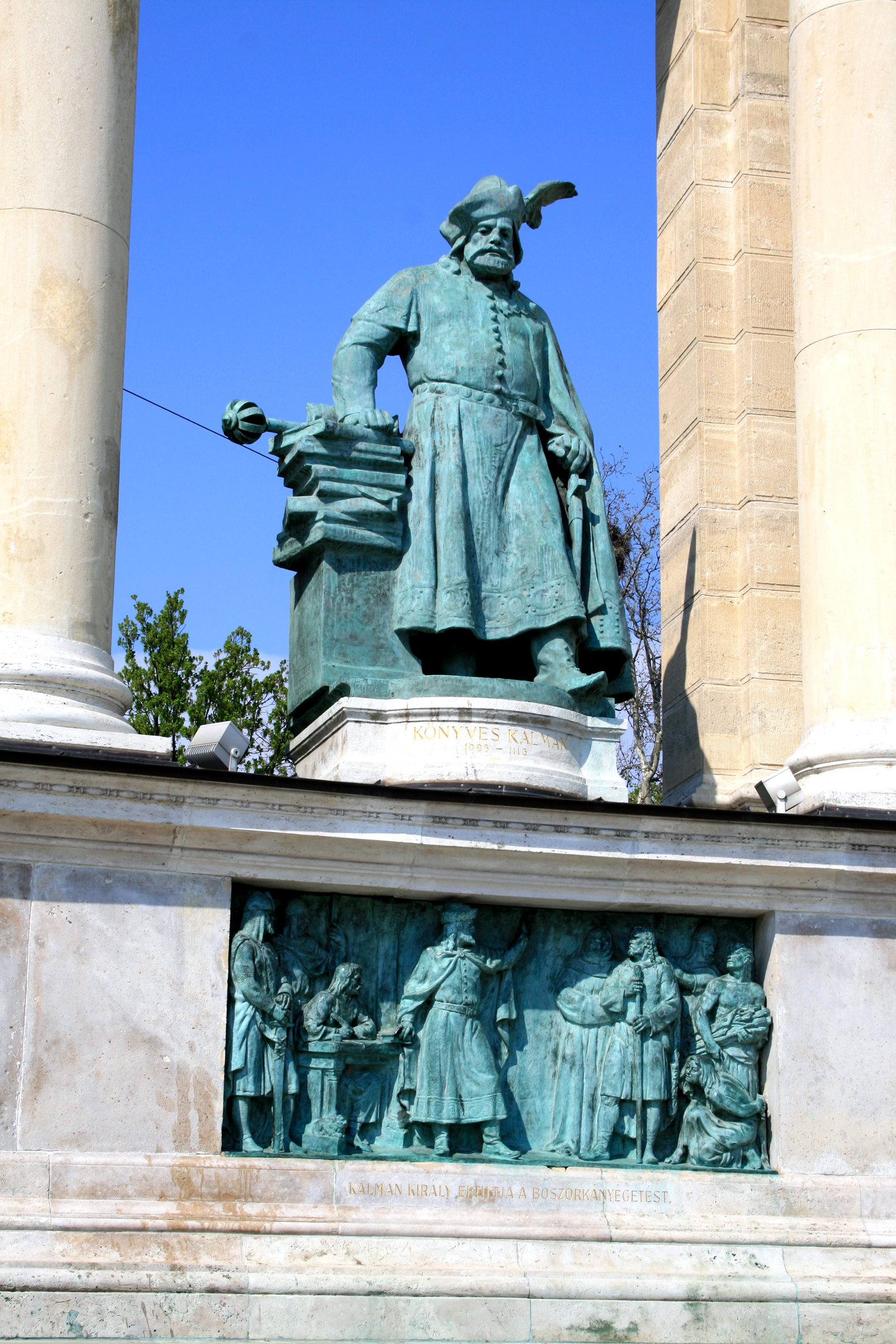
King Coloman of Hungary. Relief: Coloman the Learned prohibits the burning of witches (1100).

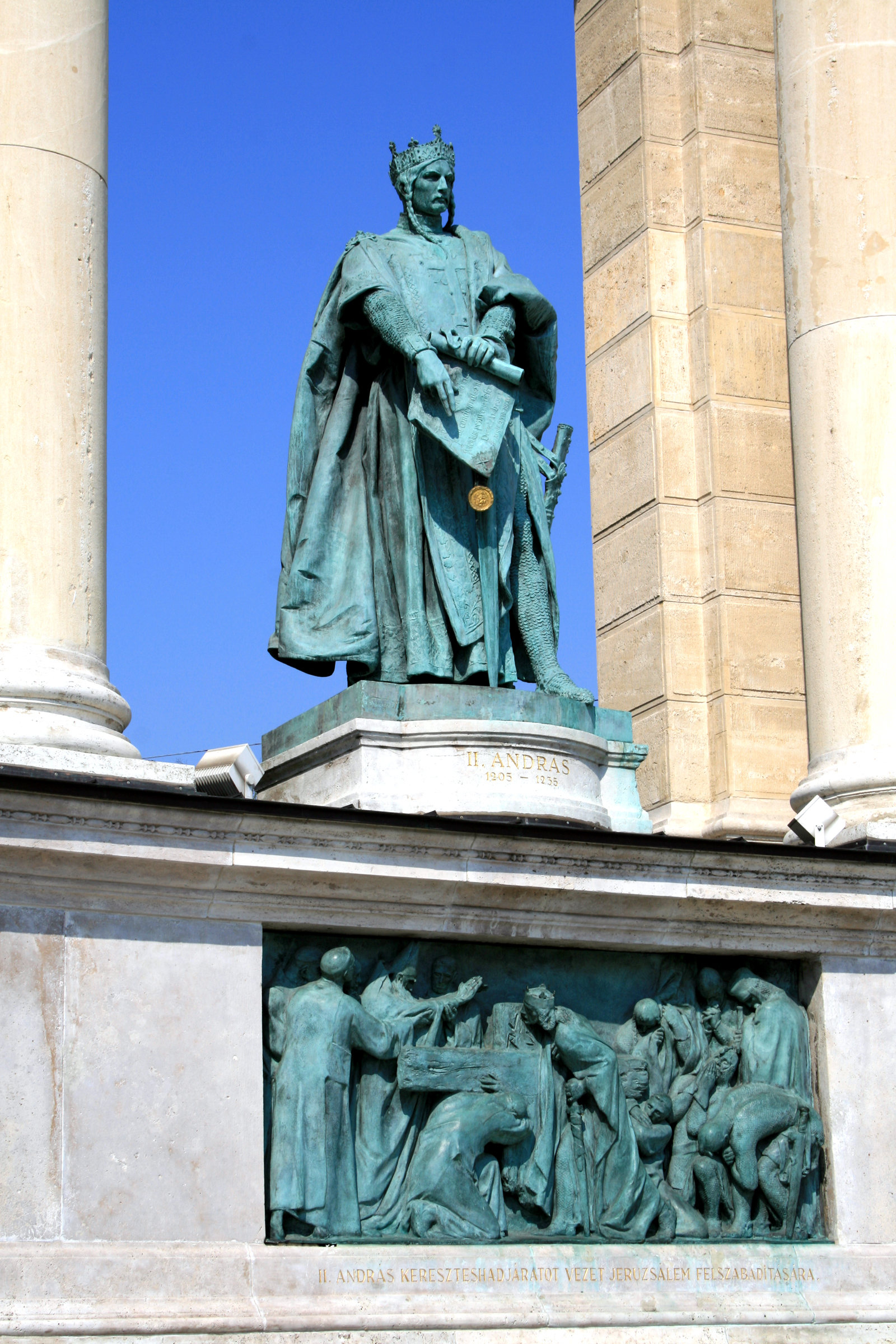
King Andrew II of Hungary. Relief: Andrew leads the Fifth crusade to the Holy Land (1217).

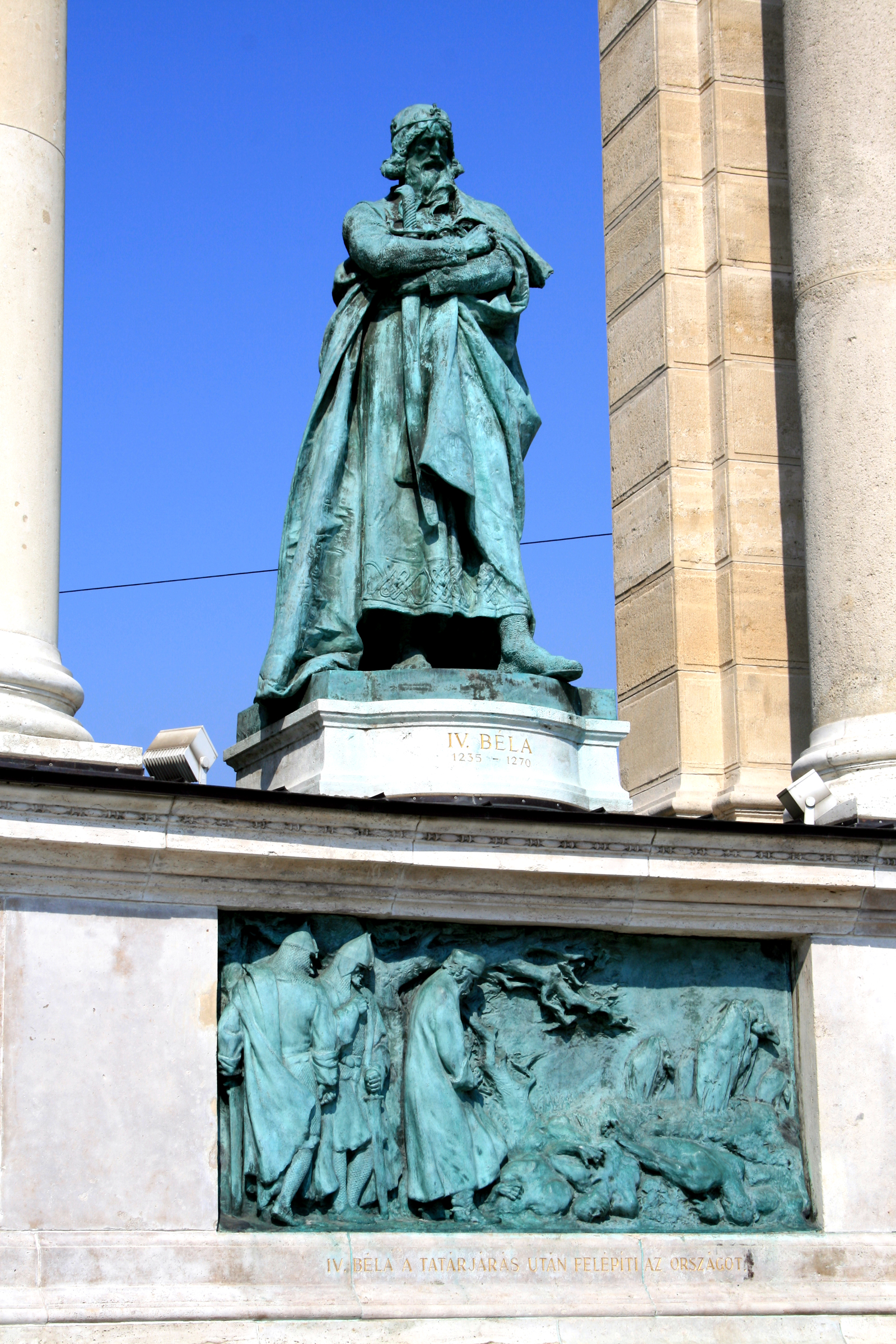
King Béla IV of Hungary. Relief: Béla rebuilds the country after the Mongol invasion (1241–1242).

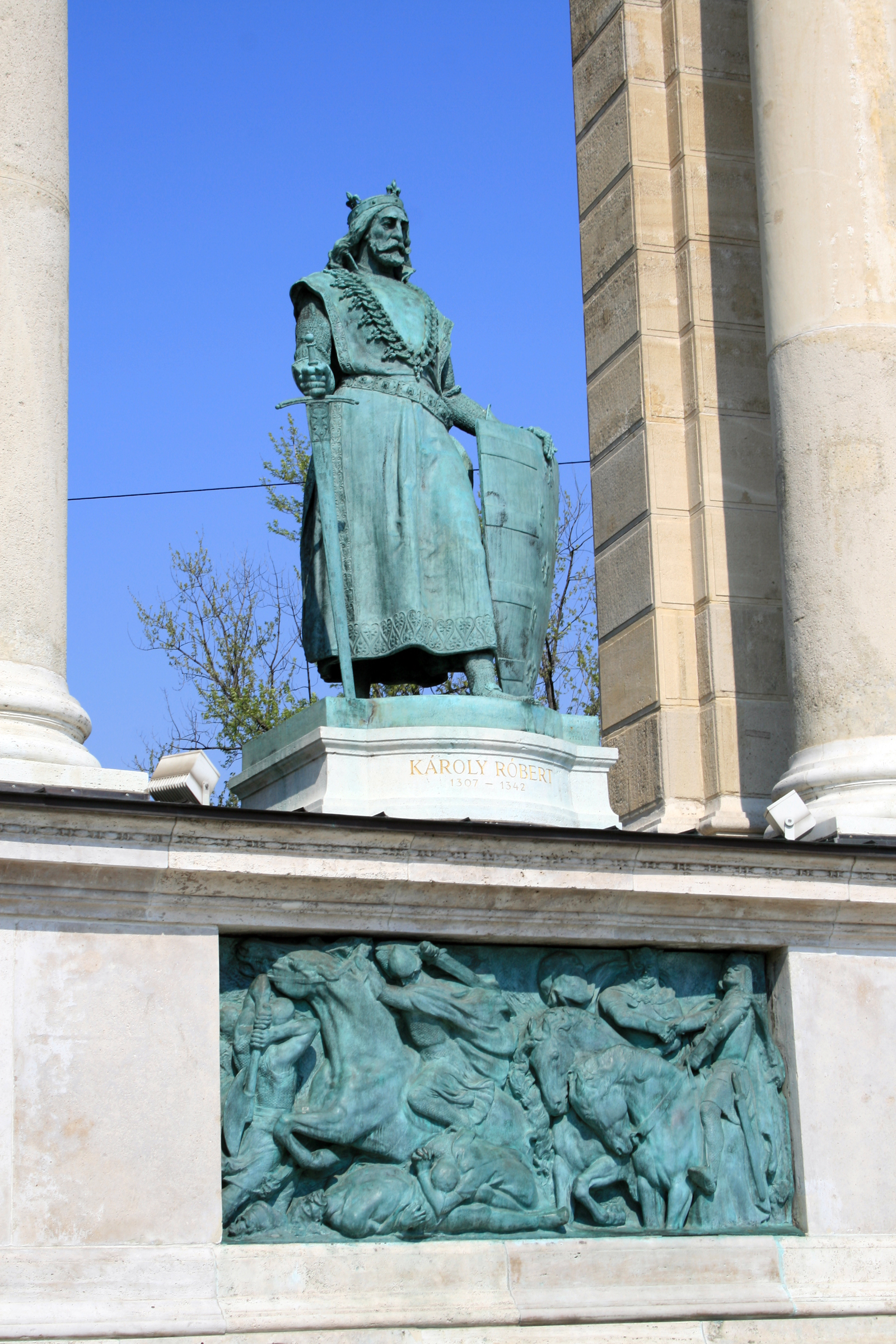
King Charles I of Hungary. Relief: King Ladislaus IV of Hungary defeats Ottokar II of Bohemia at the Battle of Marchfeld (1278).

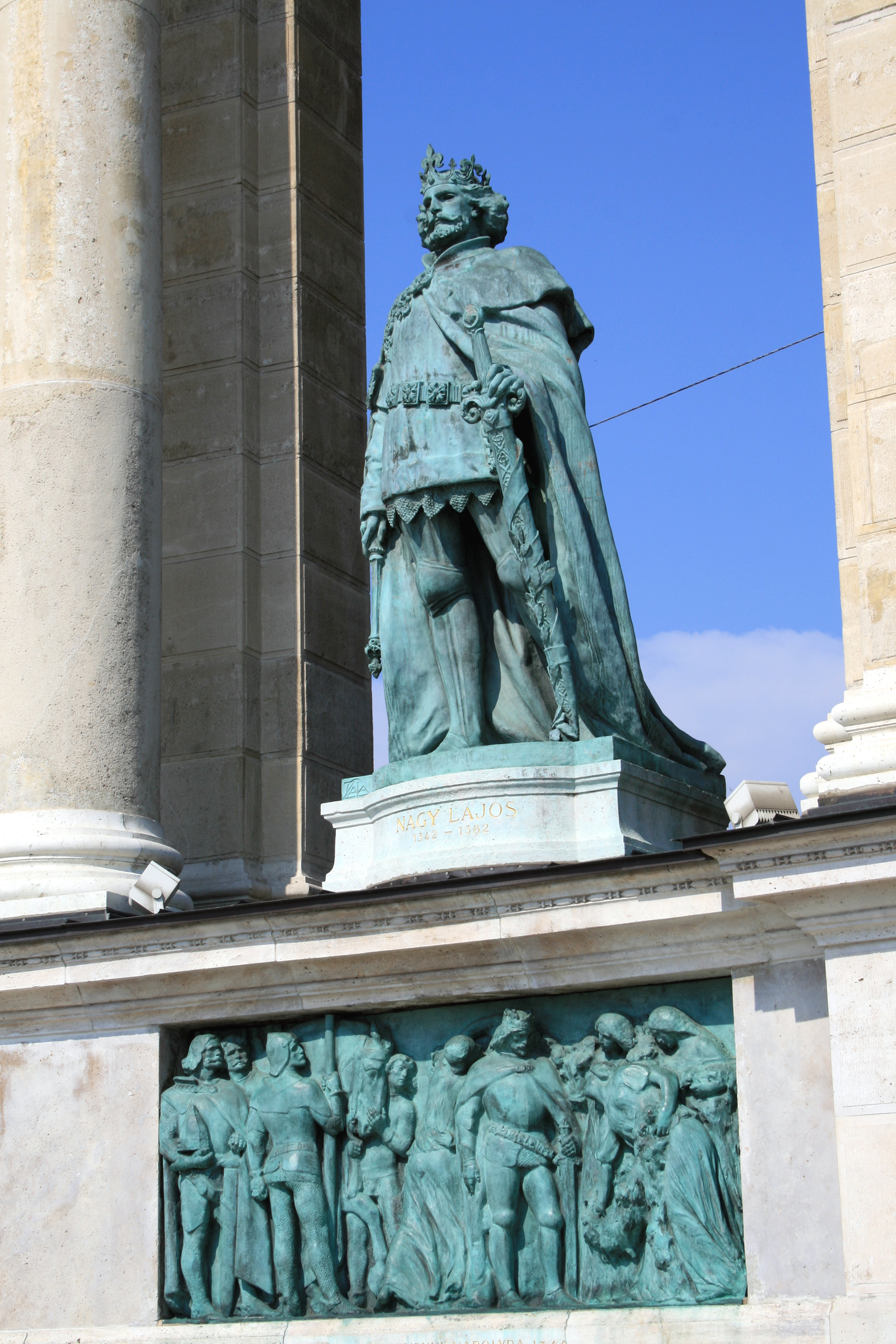
King Louis I of Hungary. Relief: Louis the Great occupies Naples (1348).

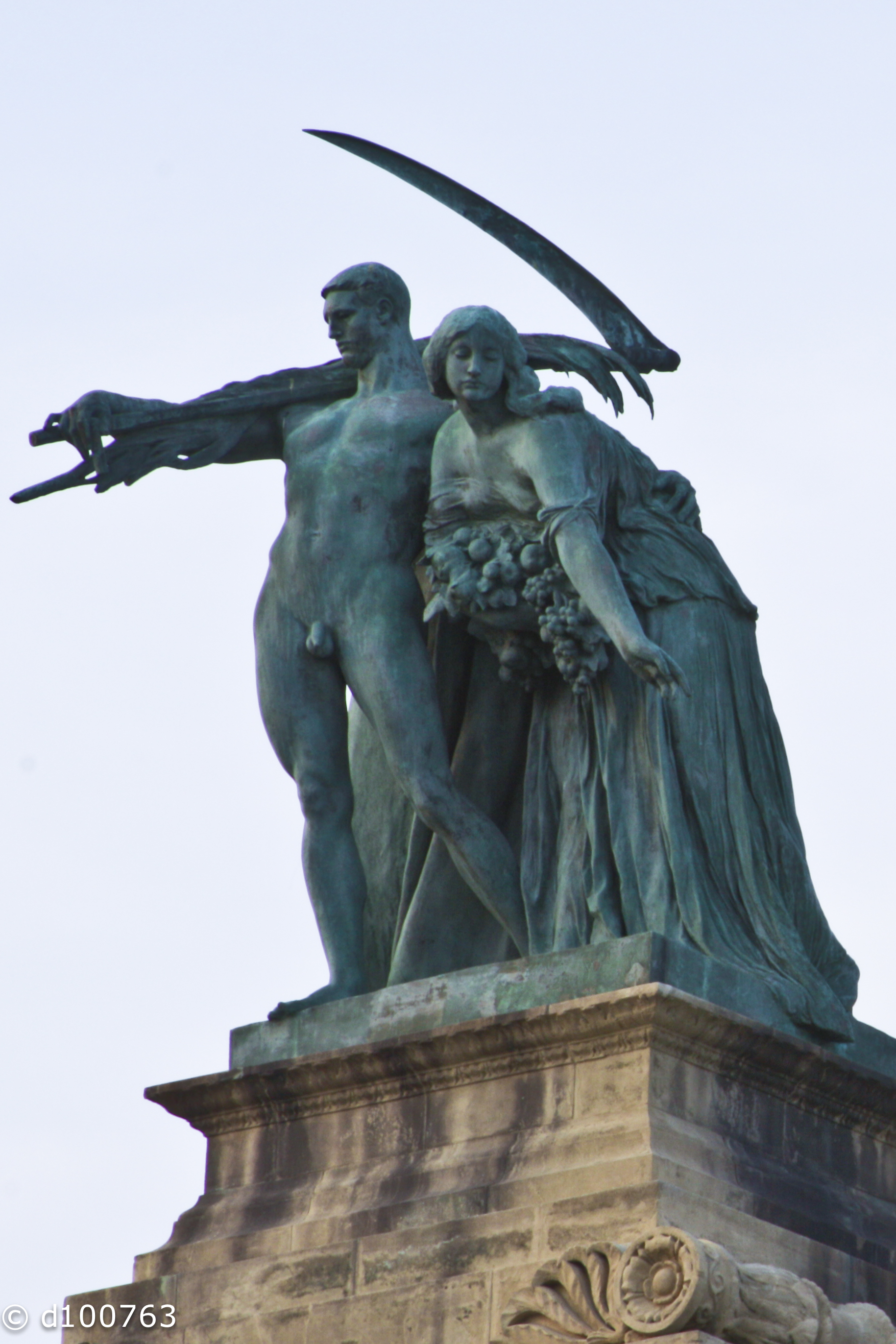
Top left: Labour and Wealth

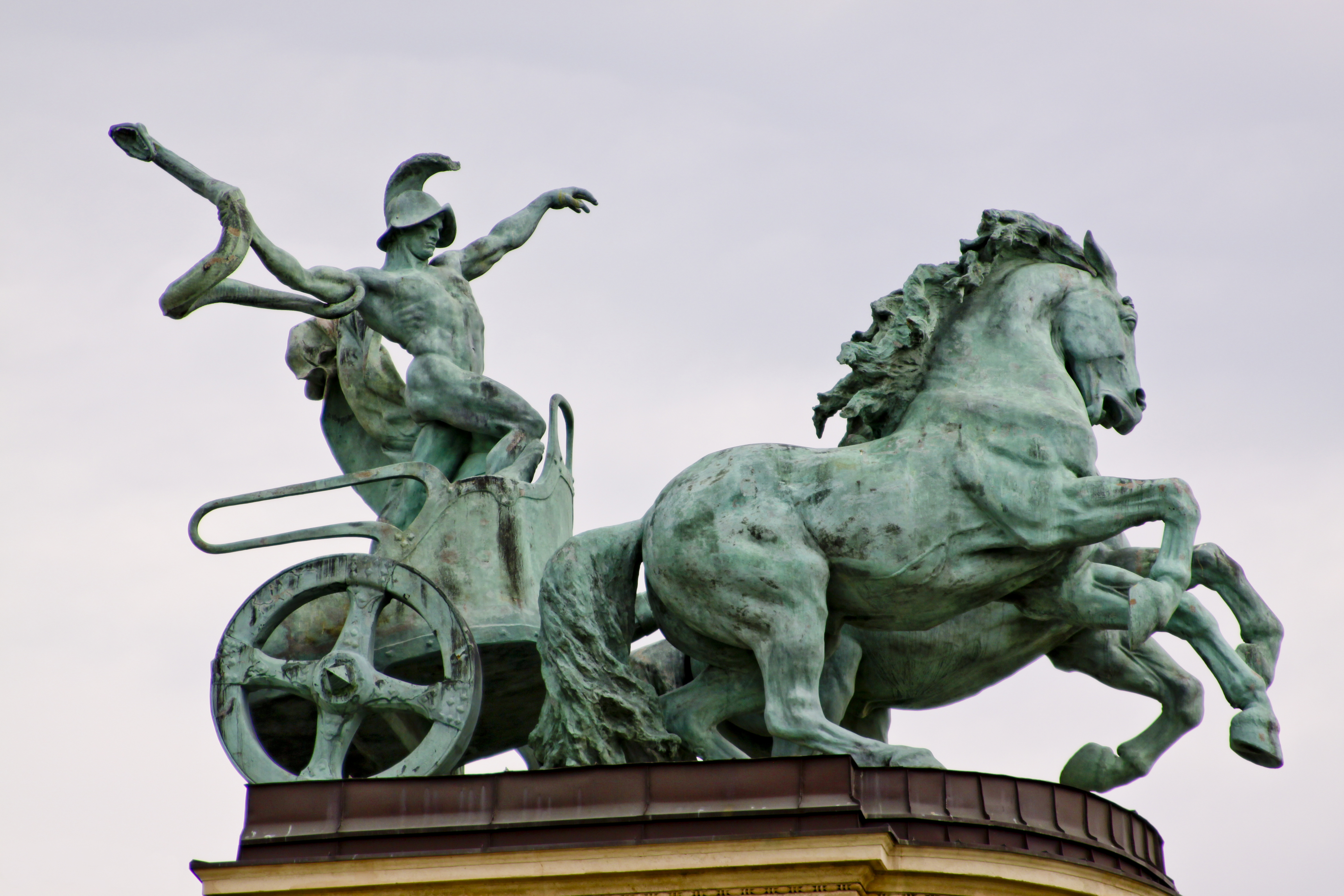
Top right: Charioteer with a snake, symbolising War

=== Statues of the right colonnade of the Millennium Monument ===
At the inner (right) end of the right colonnade is a female figure in a chariot holding a palm frond representing Peace. At the outer (left) end of the right colonnade is a double statue of a man holding a small golden statue and a woman with a palm frond, representing Knowledge and Glory.

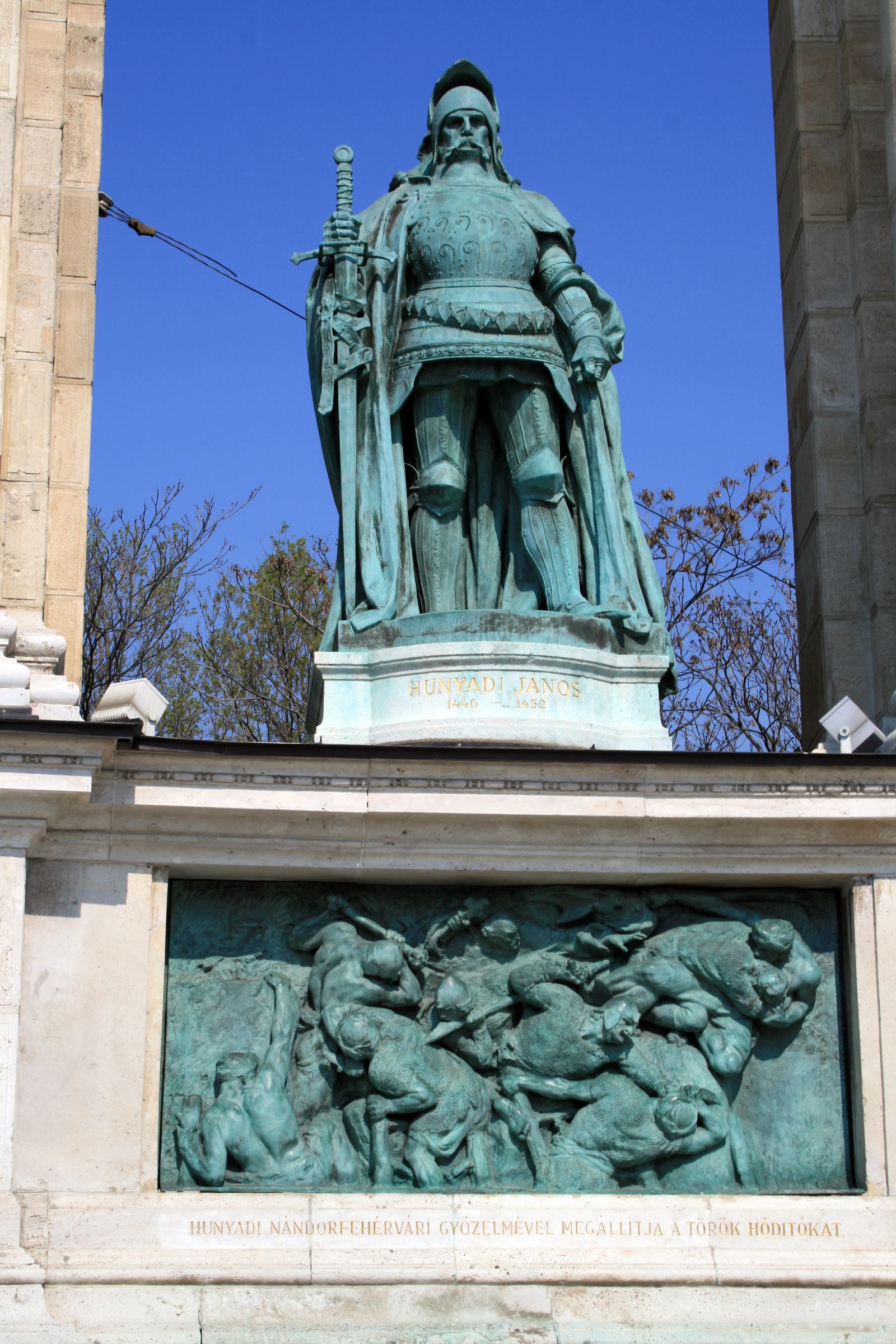
Regent-Governor John Hunyadi. Relief: Hunyadi halts the Ottoman advance with his victory at the Siege of Belgrade (1456).

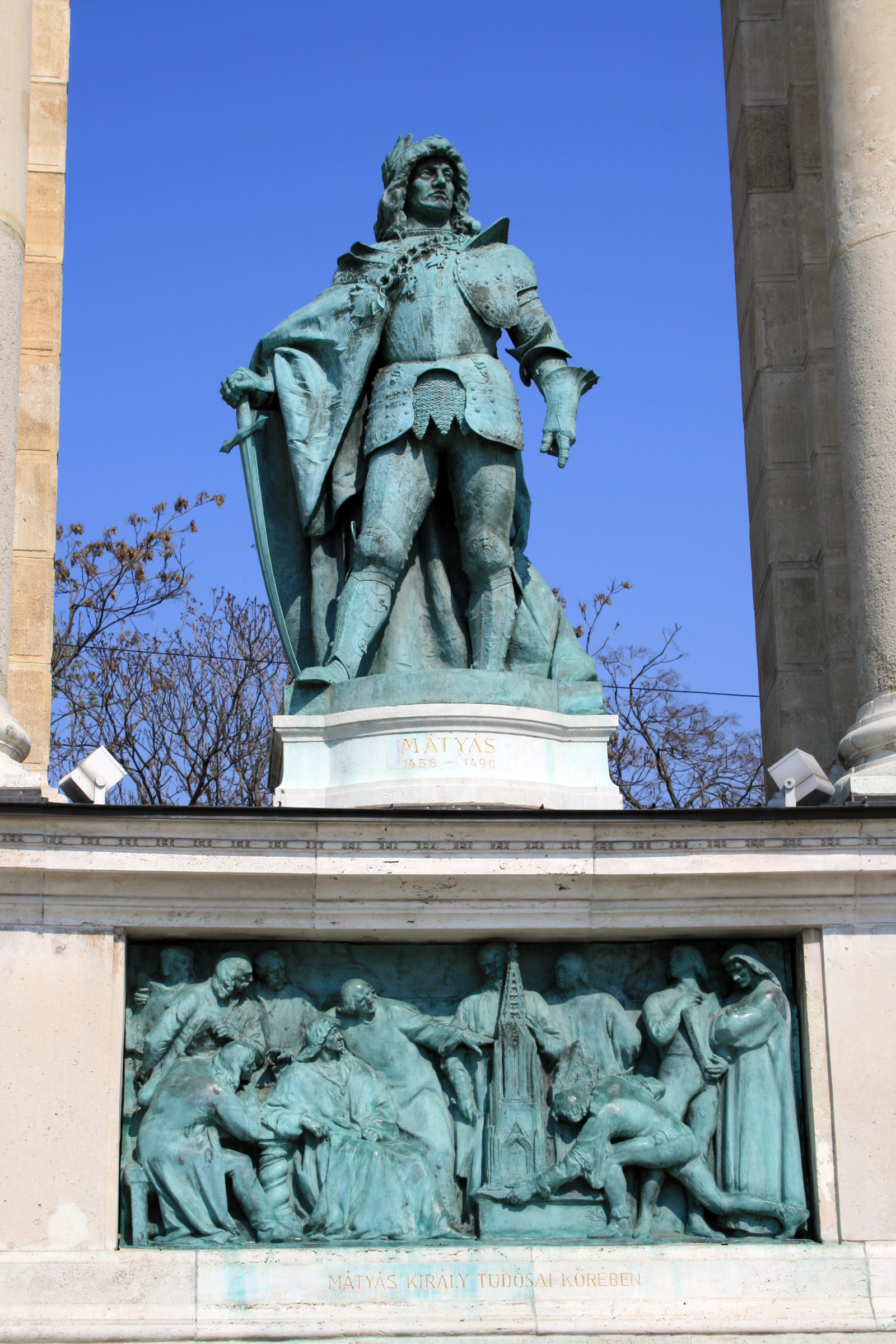
King Matthias Corvinus. Relief: Matthias surrounded by his scholars.

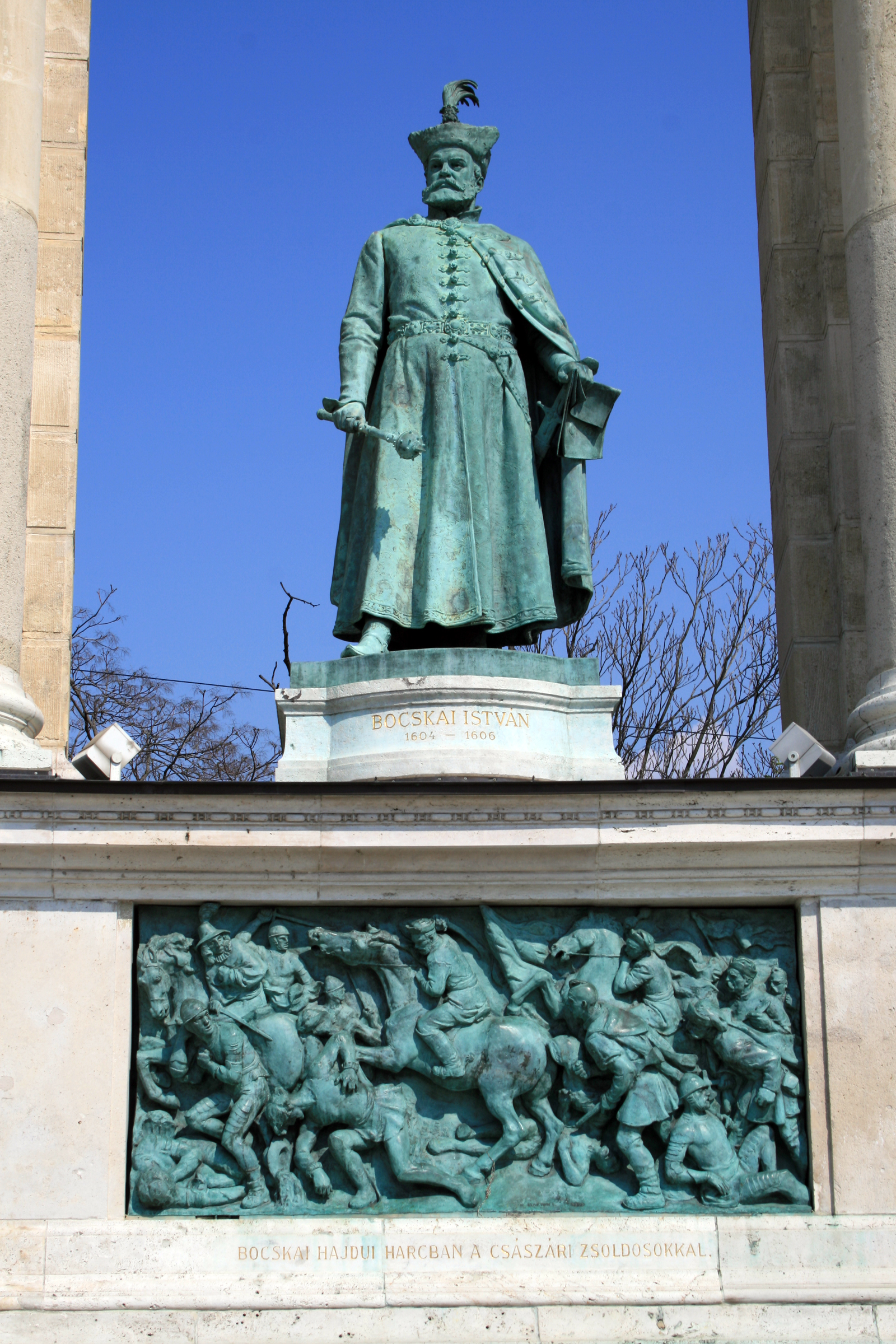
Prince Stephen Bocskai. Relief: Bocskai's Hajdú soldiers defeat the Habsburg imperial forces (Bocskai uprising, 1604–1606).

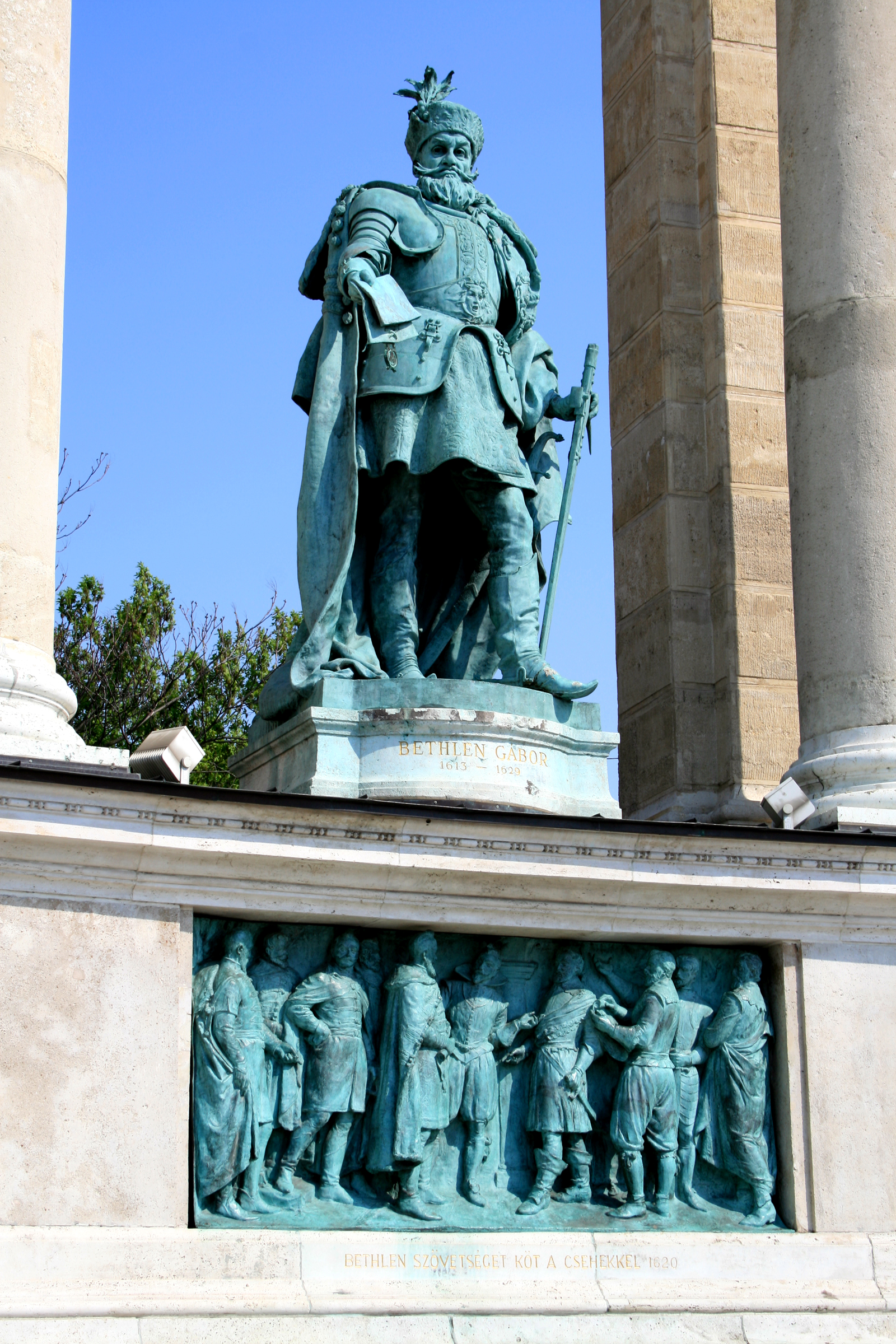
Prince Gabriel Bethlen. Relief: Bethlen forms an alliance with the Czechs (1620).

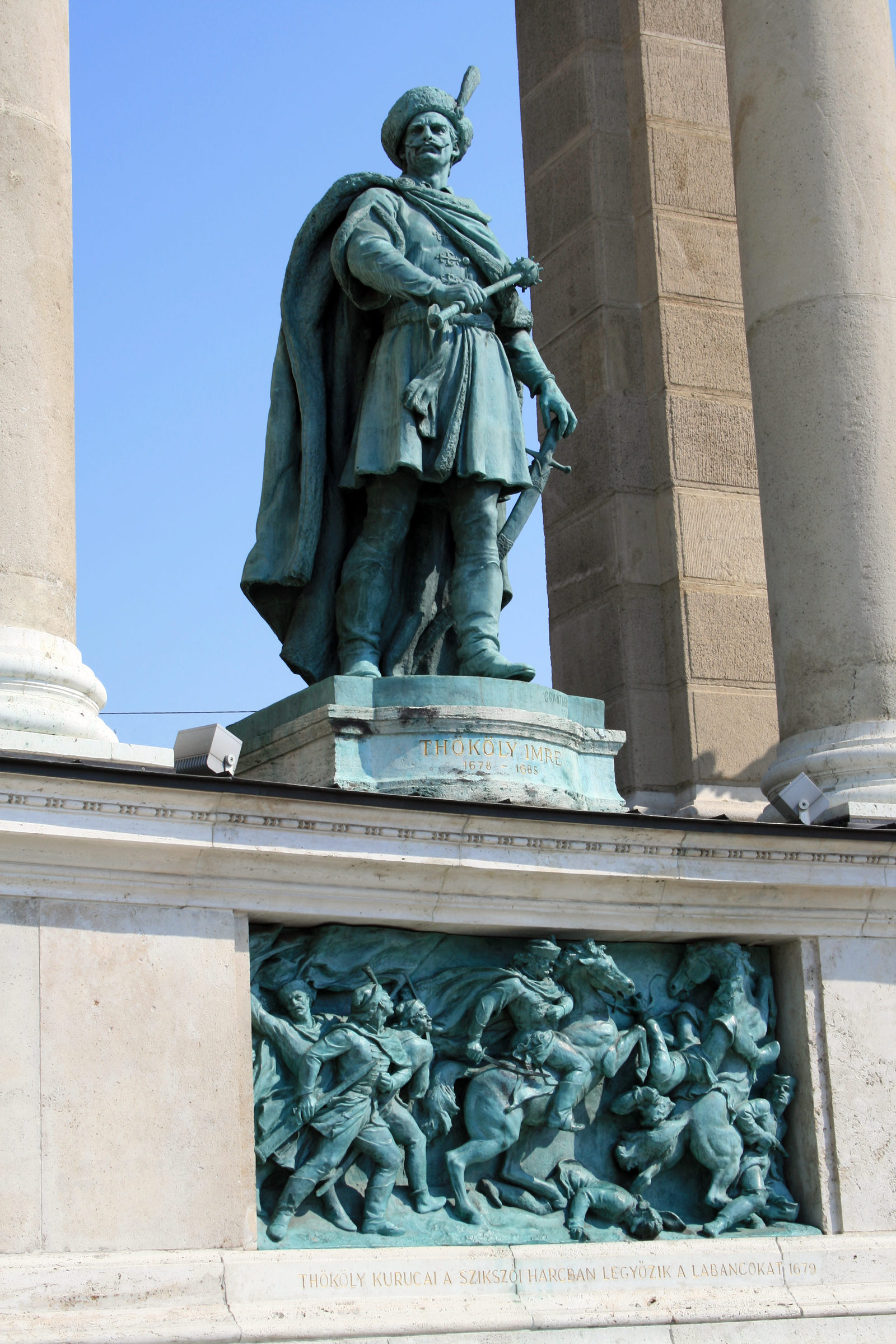
Prince Emeric Thököly. Relief: Thököly's Kuruc forces defeat the Habsburg forces at Szikszó (1679).

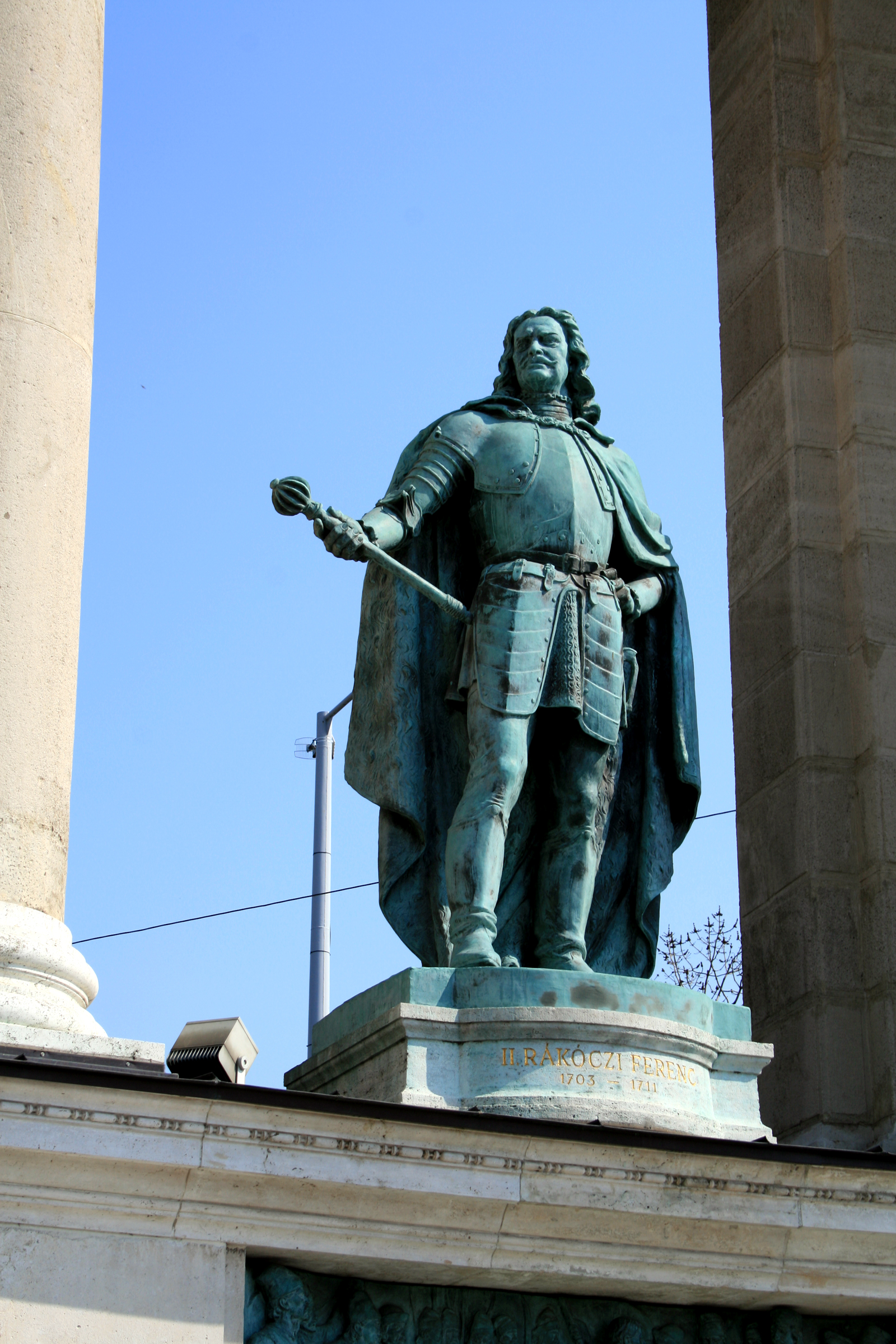
Prince Francis II Rákóczi. Relief: Rákóczi meets Tamás Esze and his army on the Hungarian border upon his return from Poland (Rákóczi's War of Independence, 1703–1711).

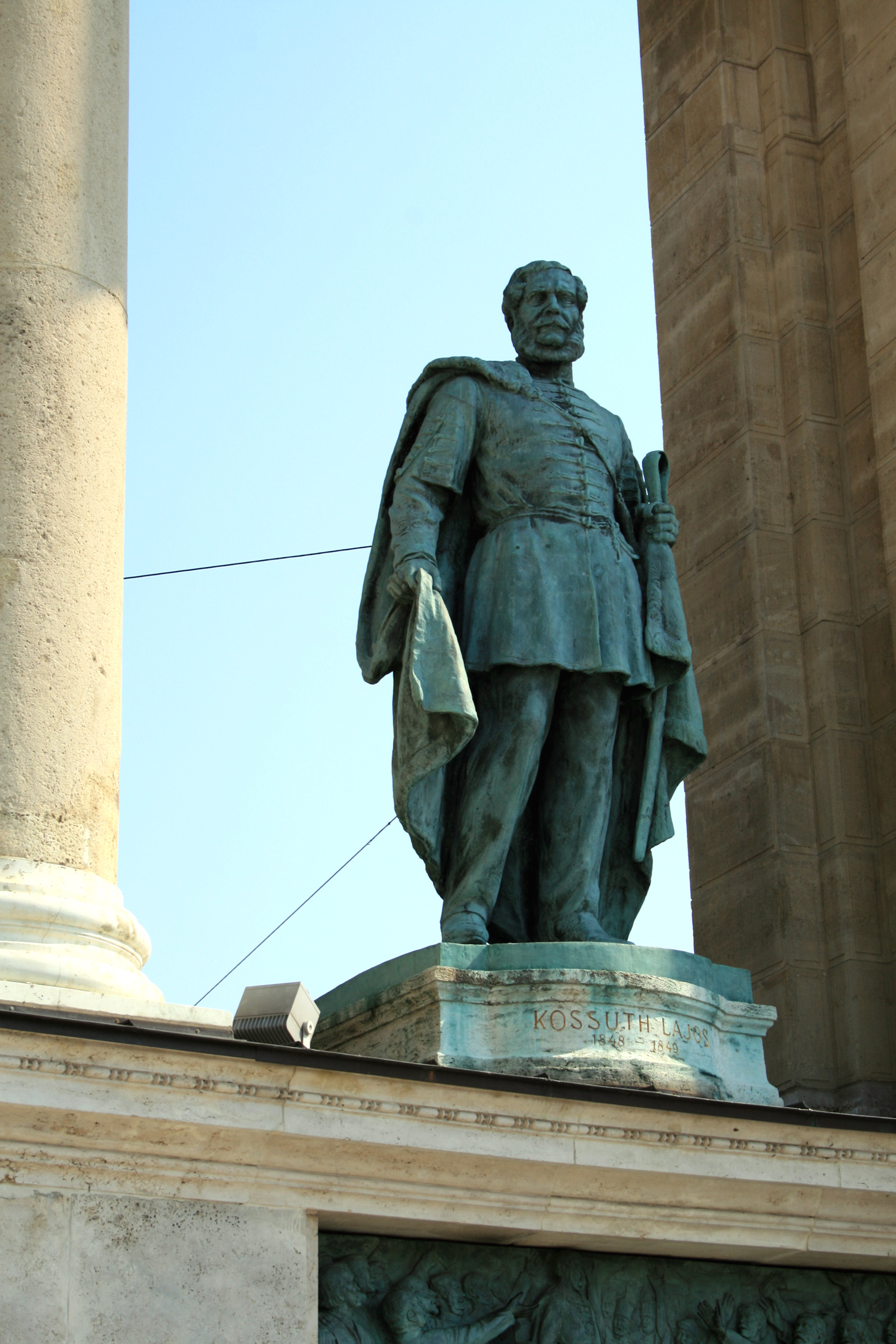
Lajos Kossuth. Relief: Kossuth calls the people of the Great Hungarian Plain to arms (Hungarian War of Independence, 1848–1849).

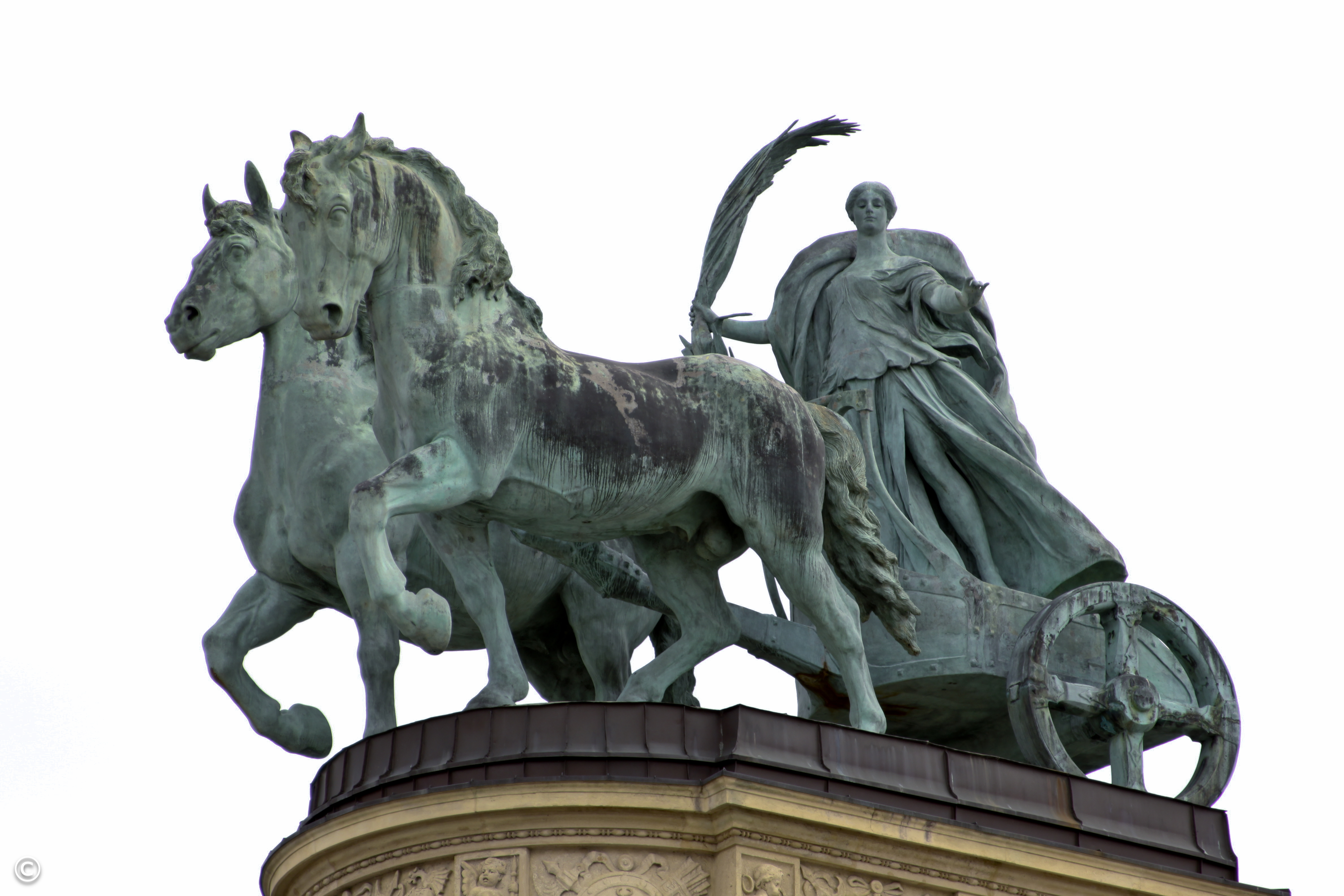
Top left: The female statue of Peace

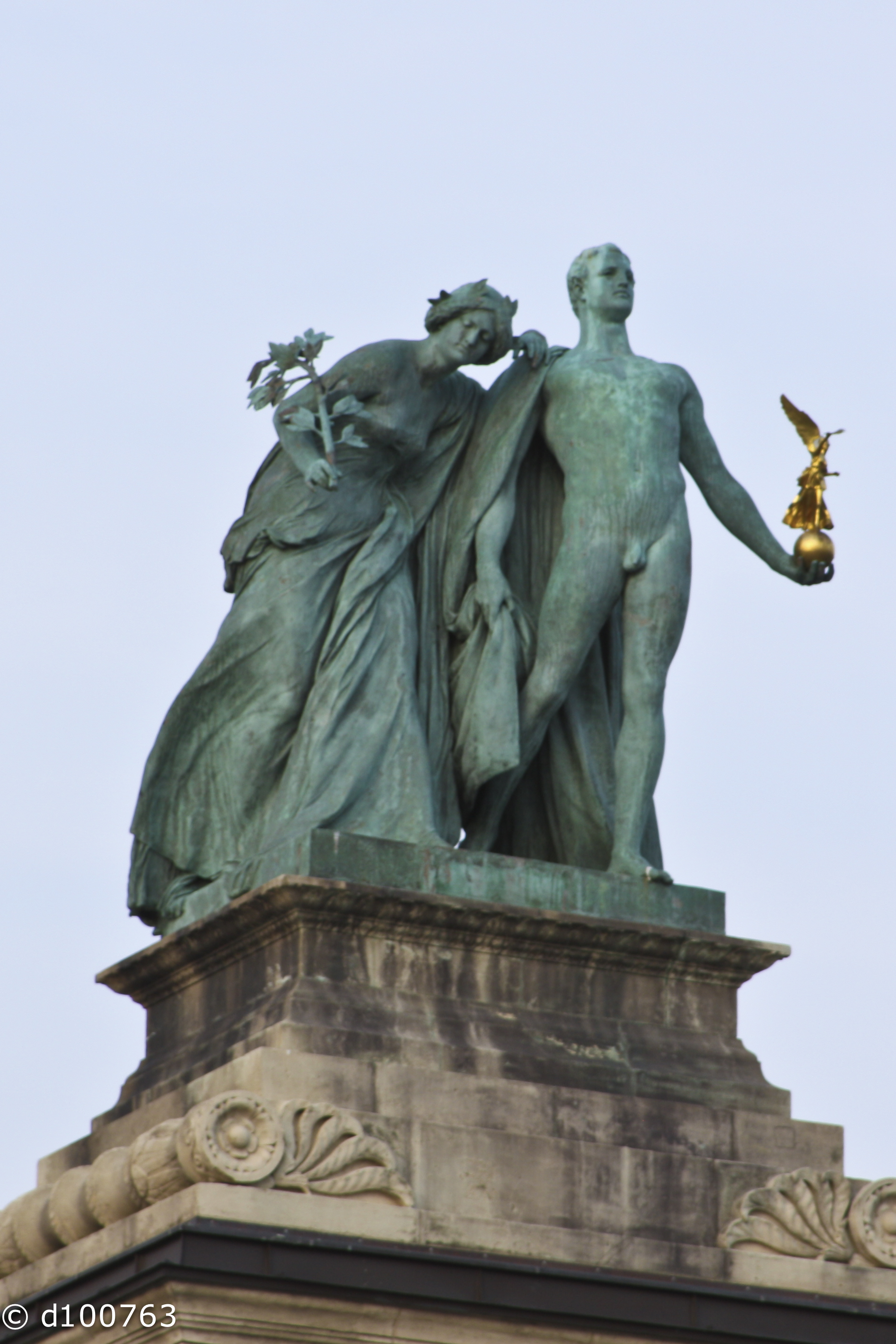
Top right: Knowledge and Glory

=== Millennium Monument ===
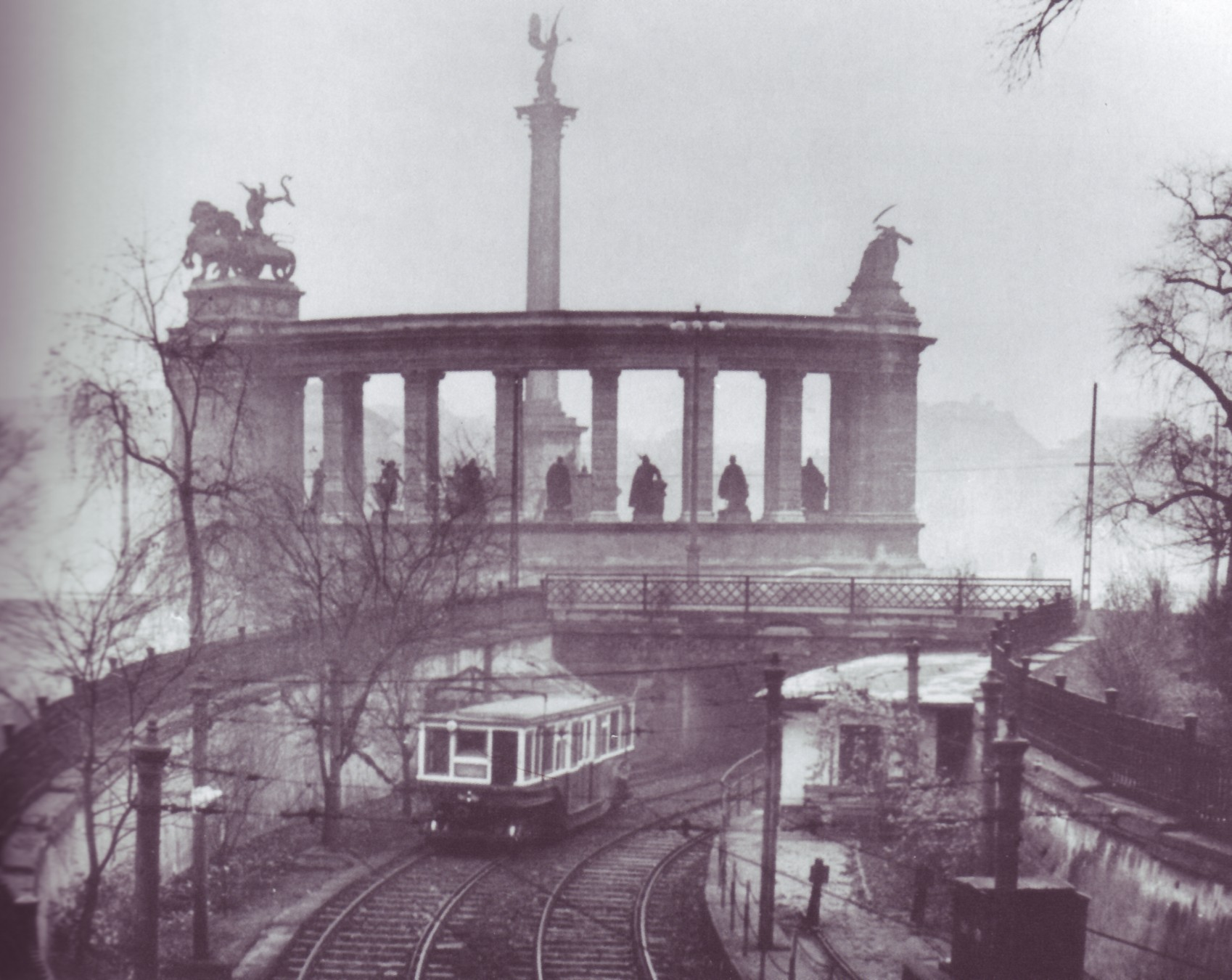
The Millennium Underground is the first underground (Metro) system in continental Europe. The end of the tunnel behind Heroes' Square, with the left colonnade seen from behind (photo from 1896)

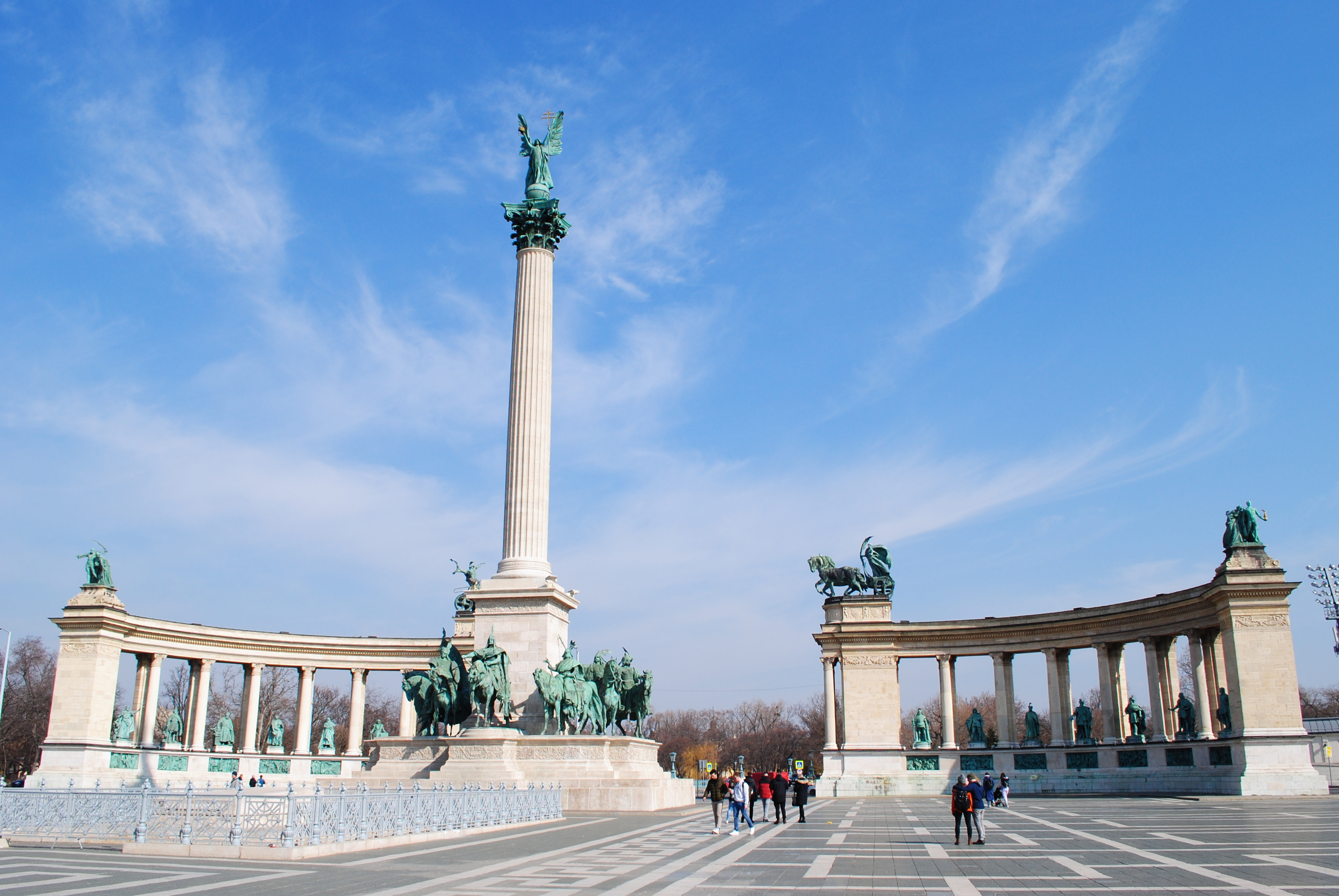
Heroes' Square

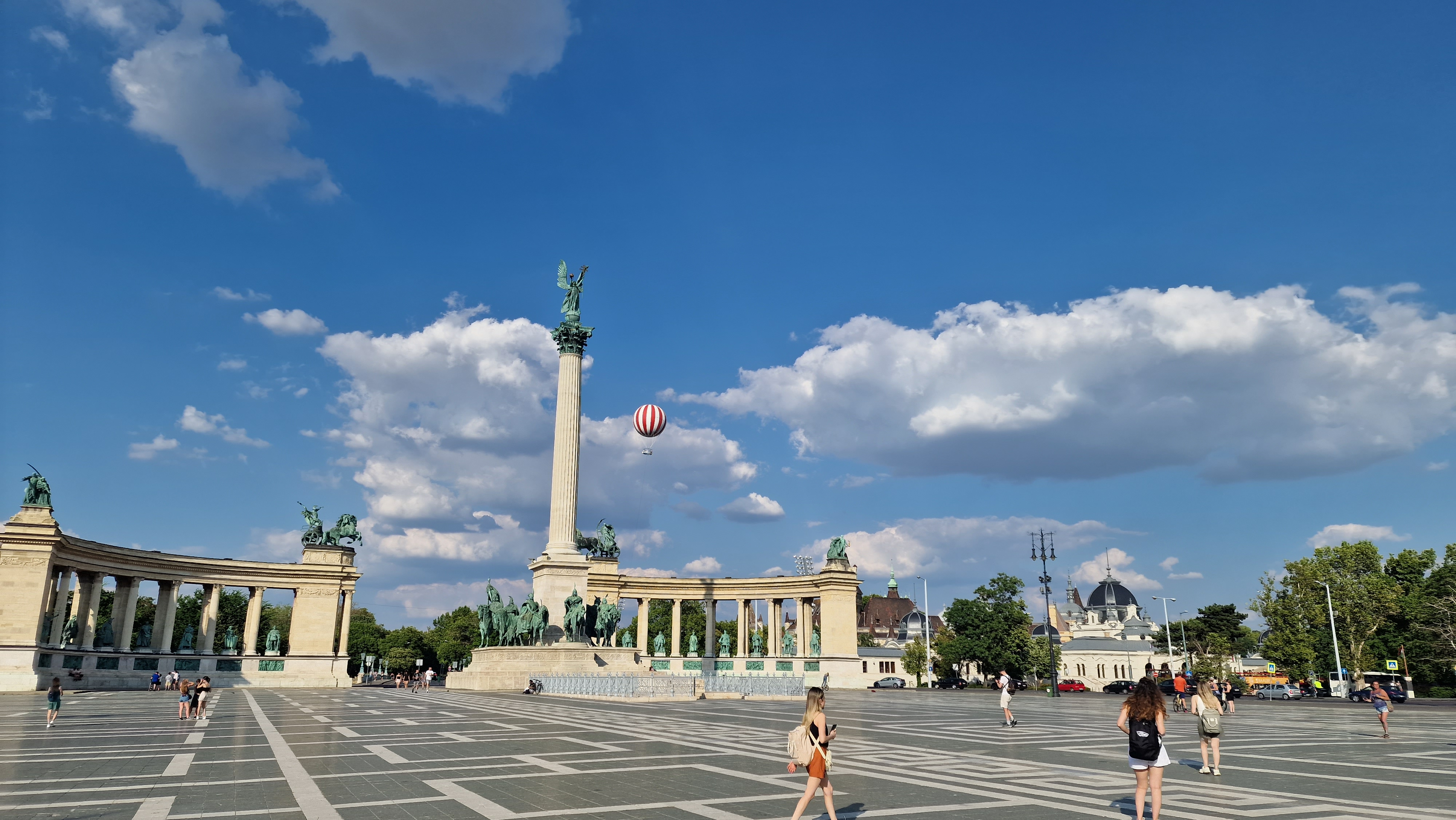
Heroes' Square

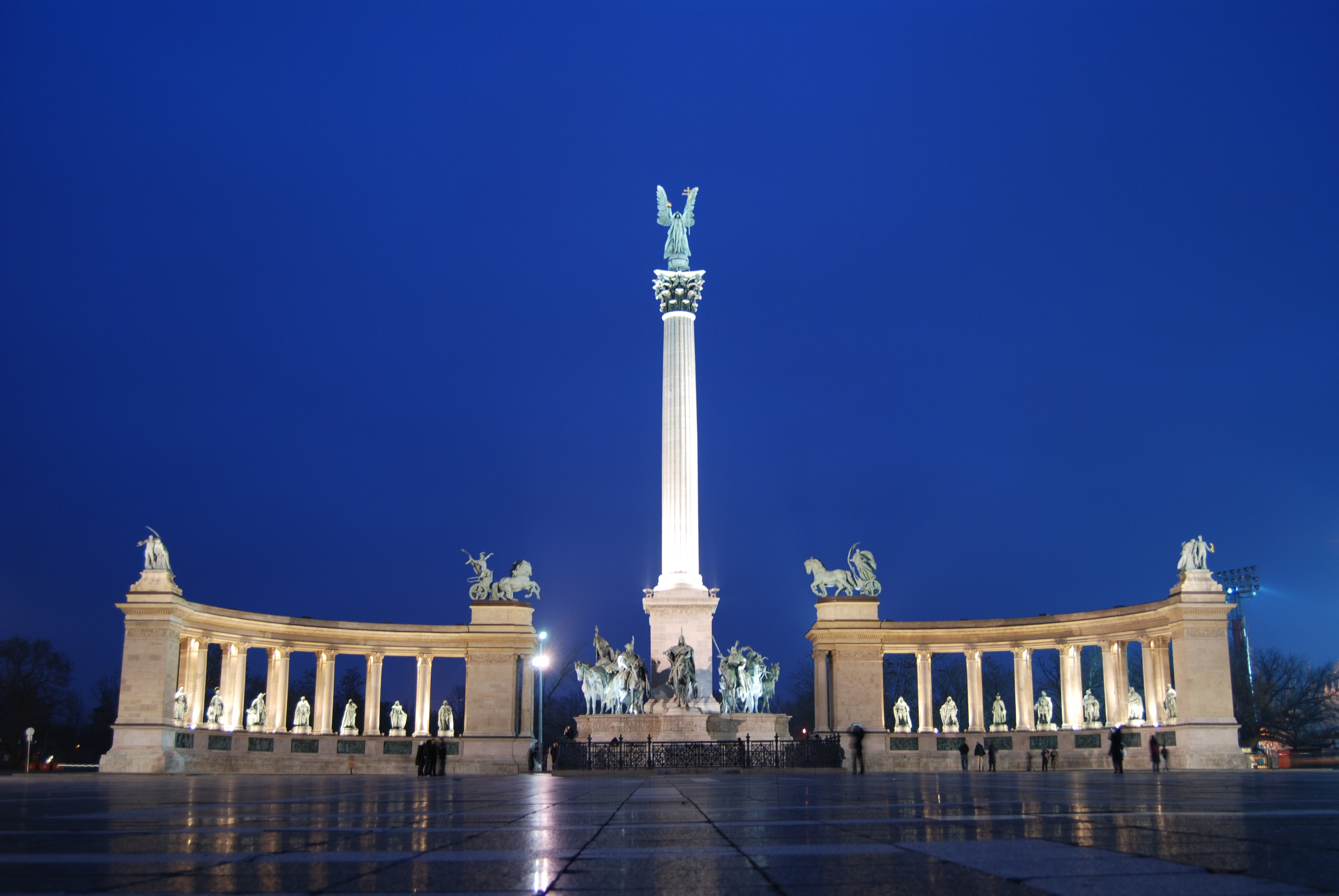
Heroes' Square at night

Heroes' Square at night

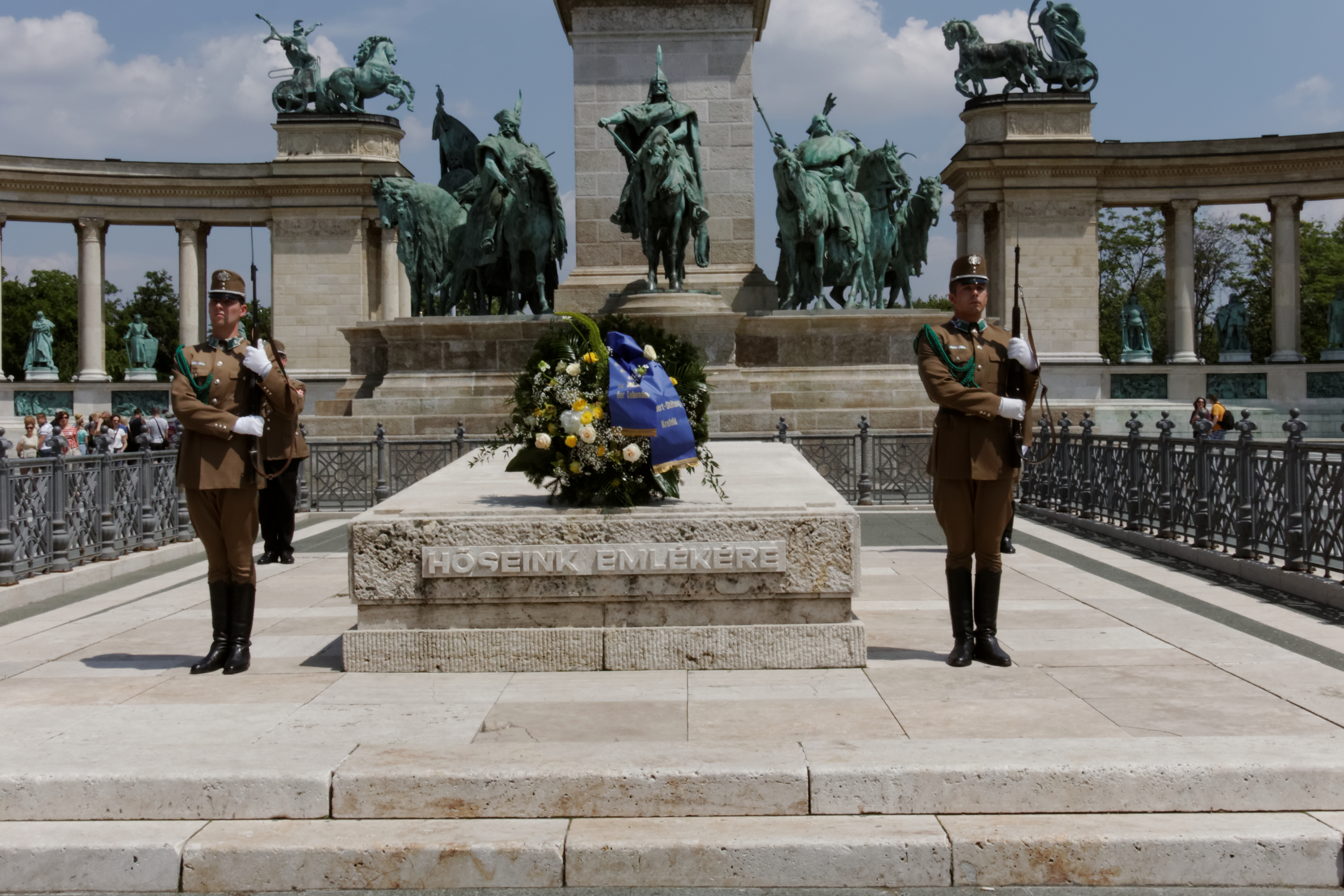
The Memorial Stone of Heroes

=== Buildings around the square ===
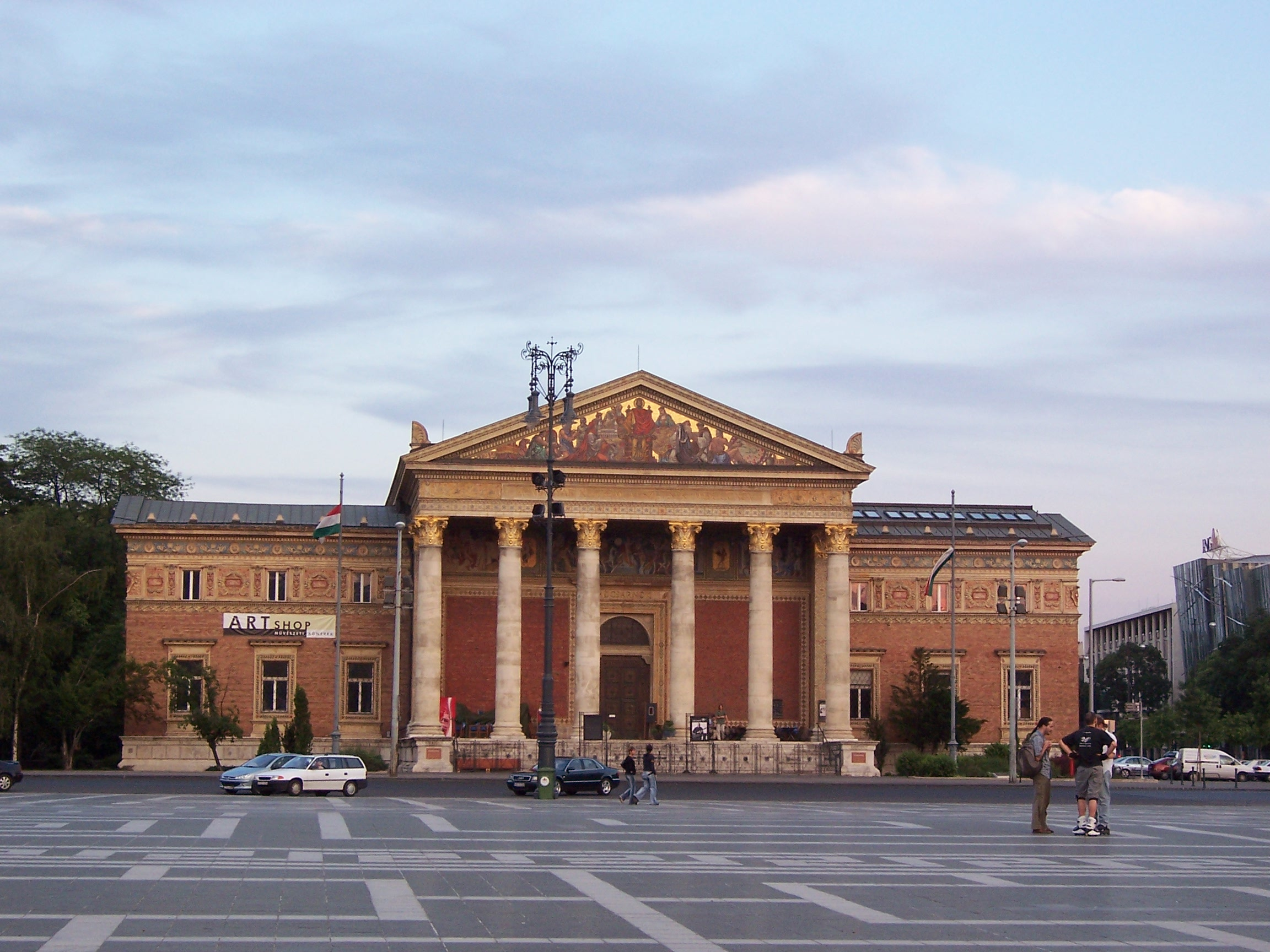
Kunsthalle Budapest at the right side of the Millennium Monument

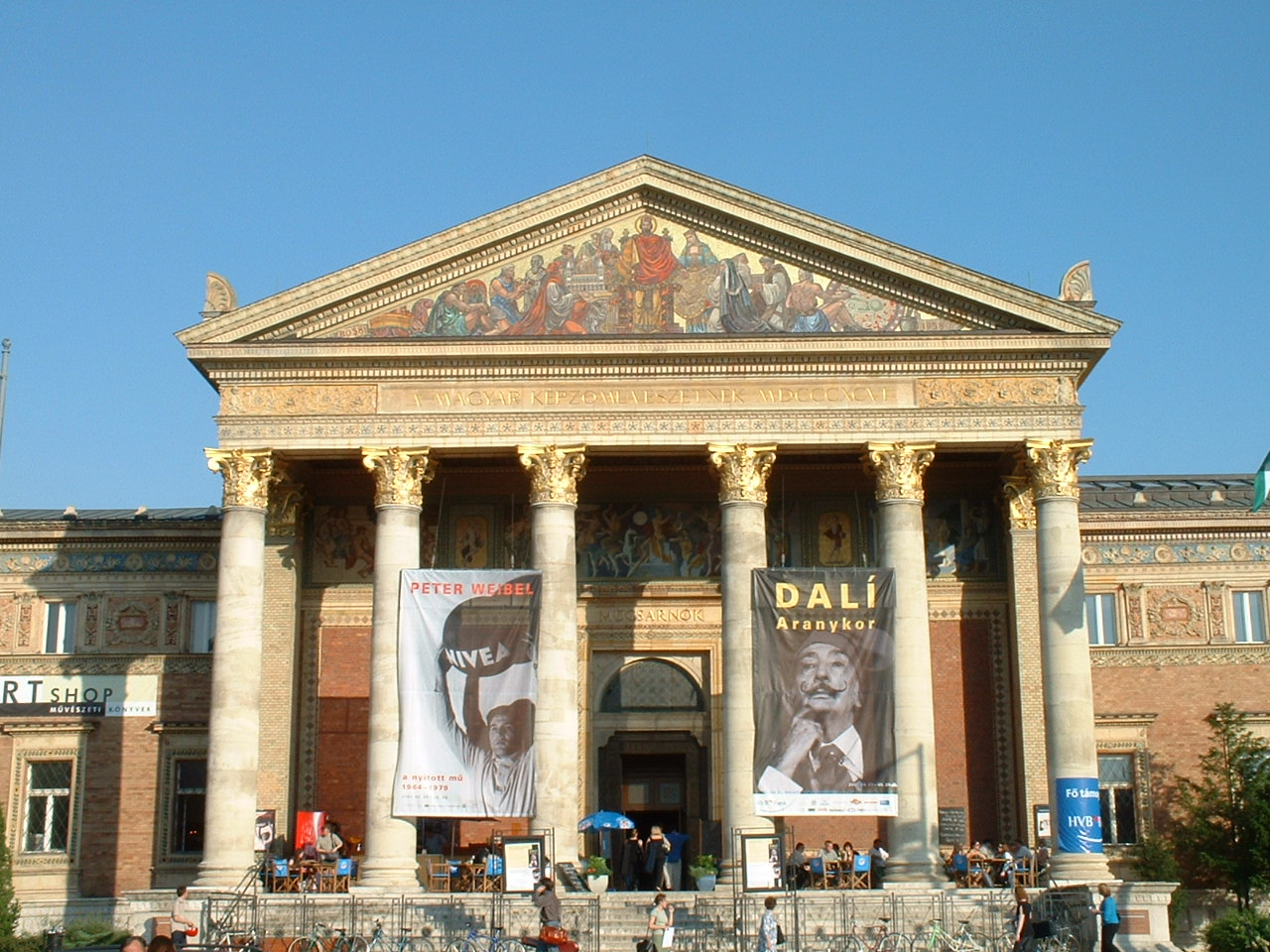
Kunsthalle, The main Entrance

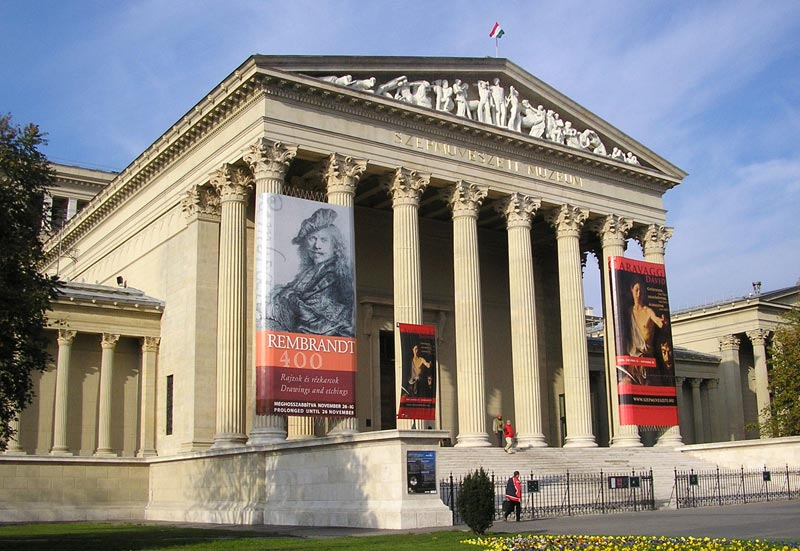
Museum of Fine arts: The main entrance

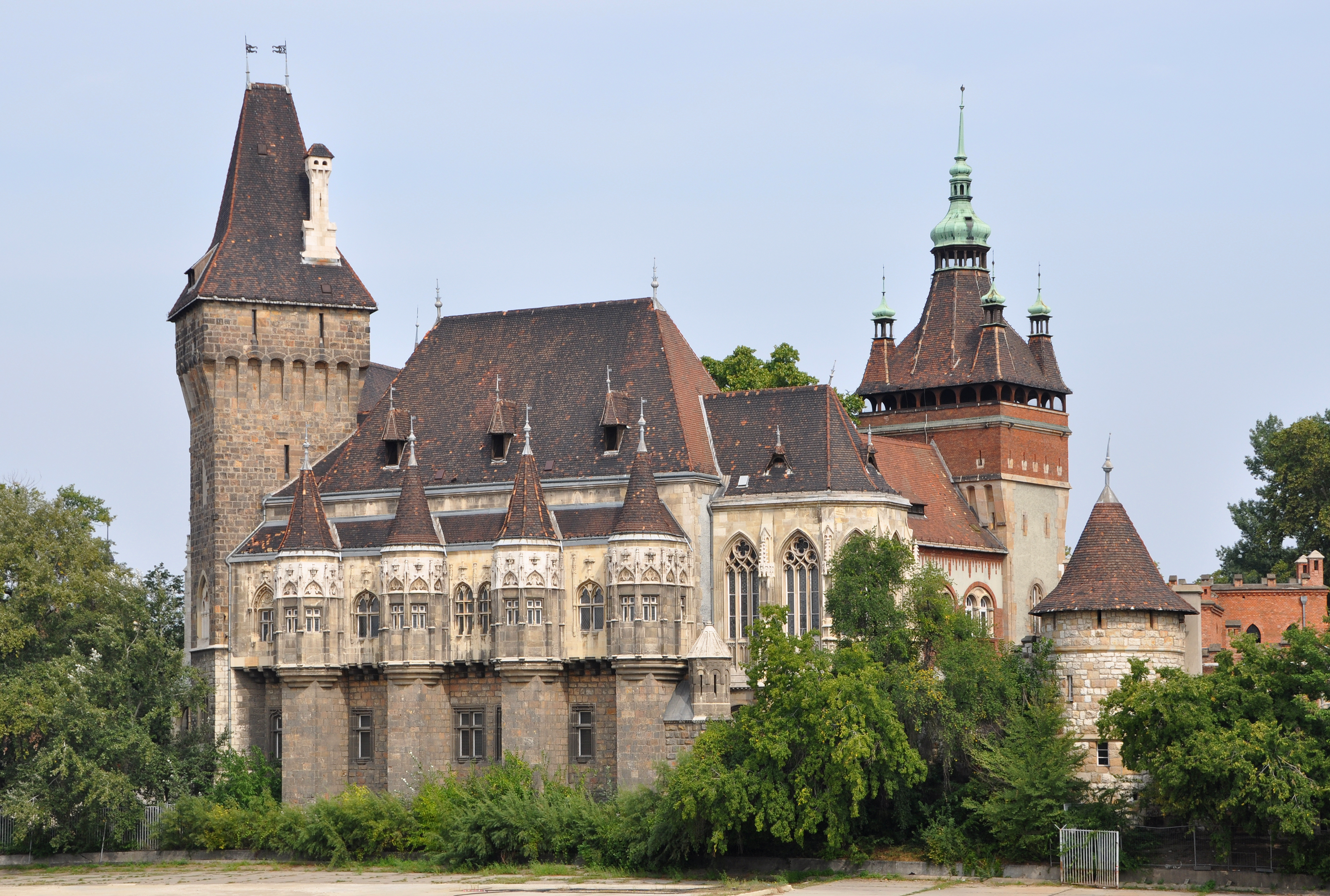
Behind the Millennium Monument: copy of the Gothic Vajdahunyad Castle

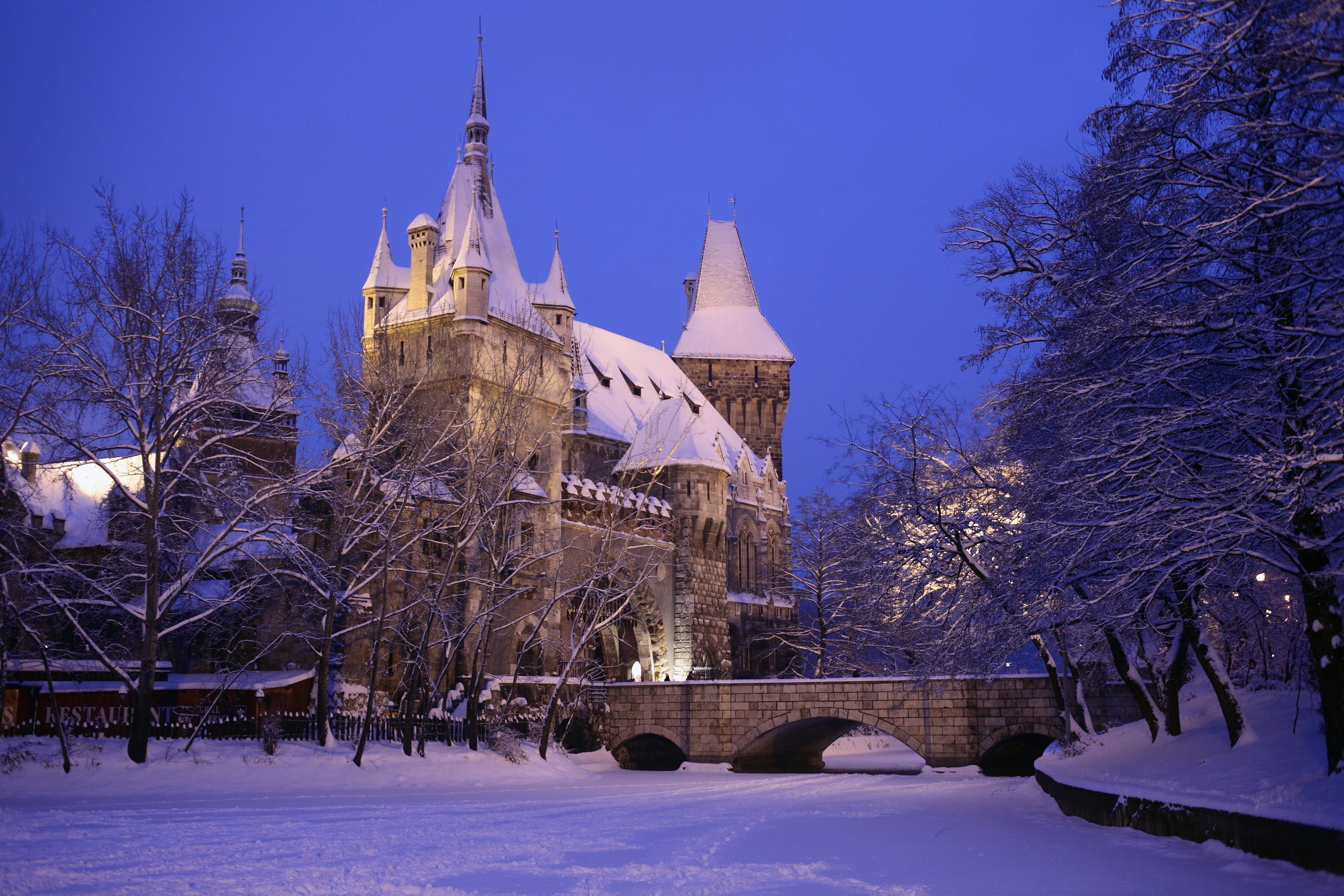
Vajdahunyad Castle
