= Ubuntu Unity =

Linux distribution based on Ubuntu, utilizing the Unity interface

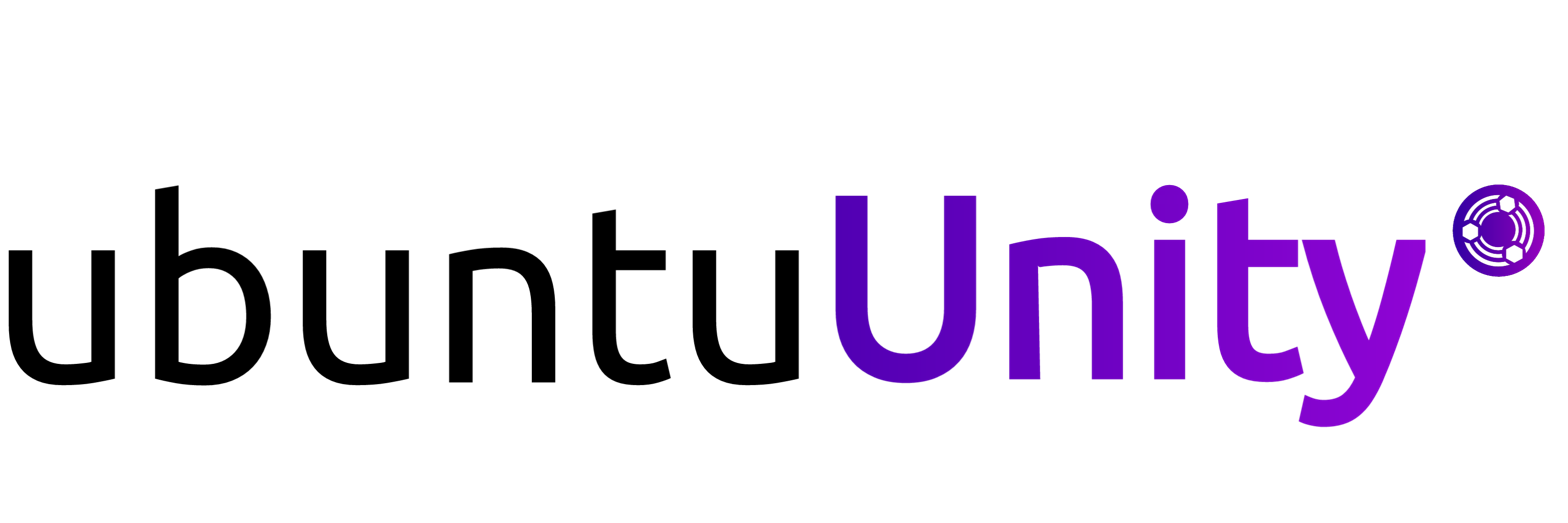

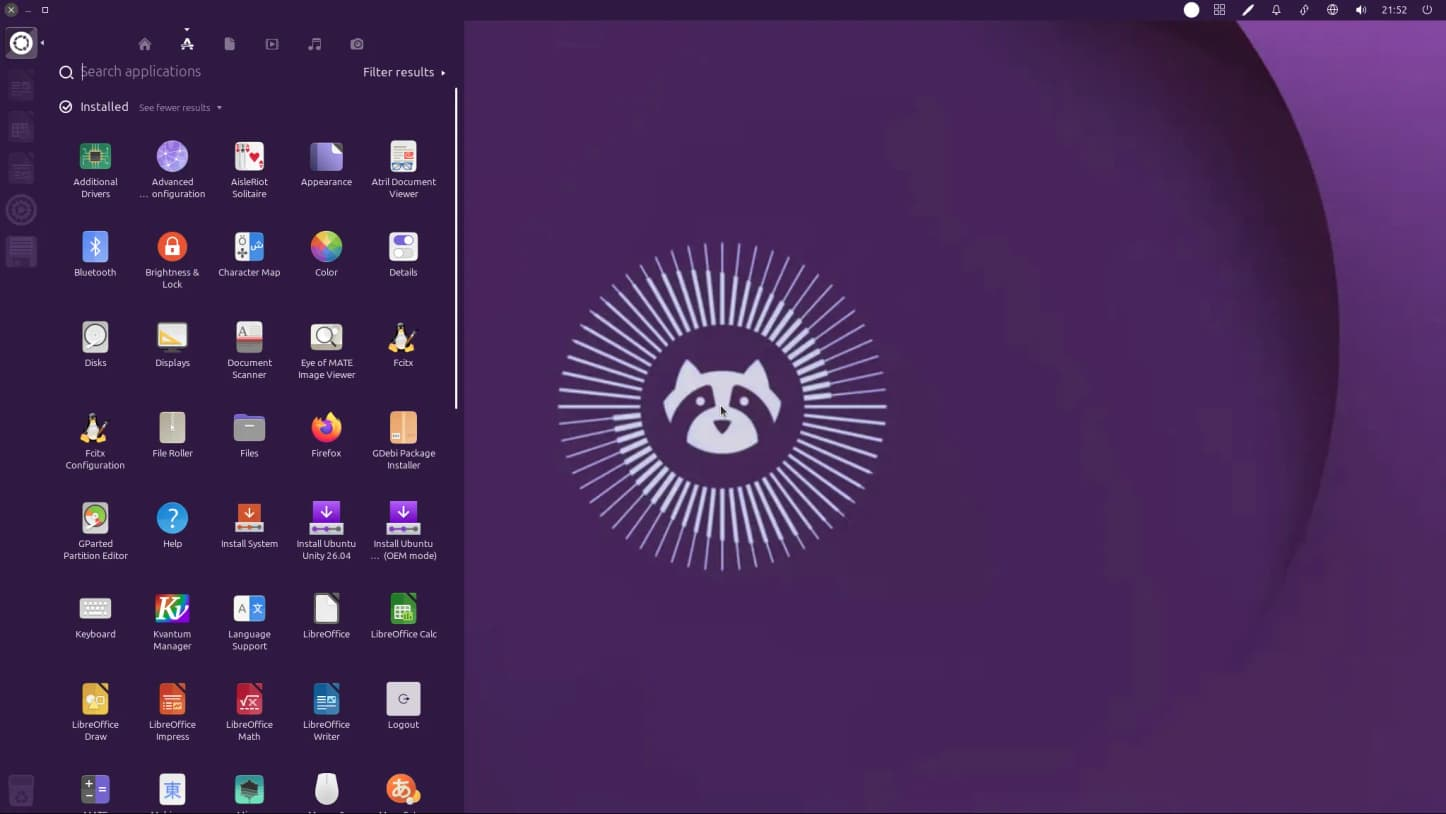
- Ubuntu Unity 26.04 Desktop running Unity 7.7.1
- Developer: Creator/Project Lead: Rudra Saraswat
- OS family: Linux (Unix-like)
- Working state: Active development
- Source model: Free software
- Latest release: 26.10 (Stonking Stingray) / 15 October 2026; 1 day ago
- Latest preview: 26.10 (Stonking Stingray) / 8 October 2026; 8 days ago (Daily Build)
- Kernel type: Monolithic (Linux)
- Userland: GNU
- Default user interface: Unity
- License: Mainly the GNU GPL among various others
- Official website: ubuntuunity.org

Ubuntu Unity is a Linux distribution based on Ubuntu, using the Unity interface in place of Ubuntu's GNOME Shell. The first release was 20.04 LTS on 7 May 2020. Prior to the initial release it had the working names of Unubuntu and Ubuntu Unity Remix.

== History ==
The Unity interface was originally developed by Canonical and first included as the default interface in Ubuntu 11.04, which was released in April 2011. Unity was developed as an alternative to the GNOME Shell, which replaced the GNOME 2 interface. At that time, Canonical had planned to converge the desktop, cellphone and tablet interfaces into Unity 8, a project that was abandoned in 2017 when Ubuntu moved to the GNOME 3 desktop instead, ending Unity development at version 7, version 8 being incomplete. Ubuntu 17.10 introduced the GNOME 3 desktop in October 2017, but it was not universally accepted by Ubuntu users or developers. A number of forks were proposed, with UBports taking over Unity 8 development for its value as a cellphone interface and renaming it Lomiri in February 2020. In 2019 Canonical gave its approval for the use of trademarks for a Unity 7 Ubuntu remix.

The first Ubuntu Unity logo

Linux Foundation Certified Developer and Ubuntu team member Rudra B. Saraswat, who is based near Bangalore, India, started Ubuntu Unity. He polled users and used a stock Unity 7 interface with the Ubuntu backend and minimal changes otherwise. He included the Nemo file manager as an alternative to GNOME Files and employed the GNOME Display Manager to replace LightDM X display manager.

Saraswat had previously created several other Linux distributions, including the server-focused Krob Linux. About his motivations for starting Ubuntu Unity, Saraswat stated, "I had used Ubuntu 17.04 back when I was 8 [years old] and I really loved Unity7, so when Unity7 was discontinued by Canonical, I wasn't happy and wanted to bring it back. I created this project to give Unity7 a new life". Saraswat was ten years old in 2020 when he first released Ubuntu Unity. He indicated at the time that his goal was to eventually have the distribution accepted as an official Ubuntu "flavour".

Ubuntu Unity became a recognized flavour starting with the 22.10 release.

== Releases ==
=== Before Ubuntu Unity ===
Unity7 was the default Desktop Environment of Ubuntu from Ubuntu 11.04 to Ubuntu 17.04, before being replaced by GNOME 3.

There are versions of Ubuntu Unity based on Ubuntu 18.04 LTS available on the Internet Archive.

=== Ubuntu Unity 20.04 LTS ===
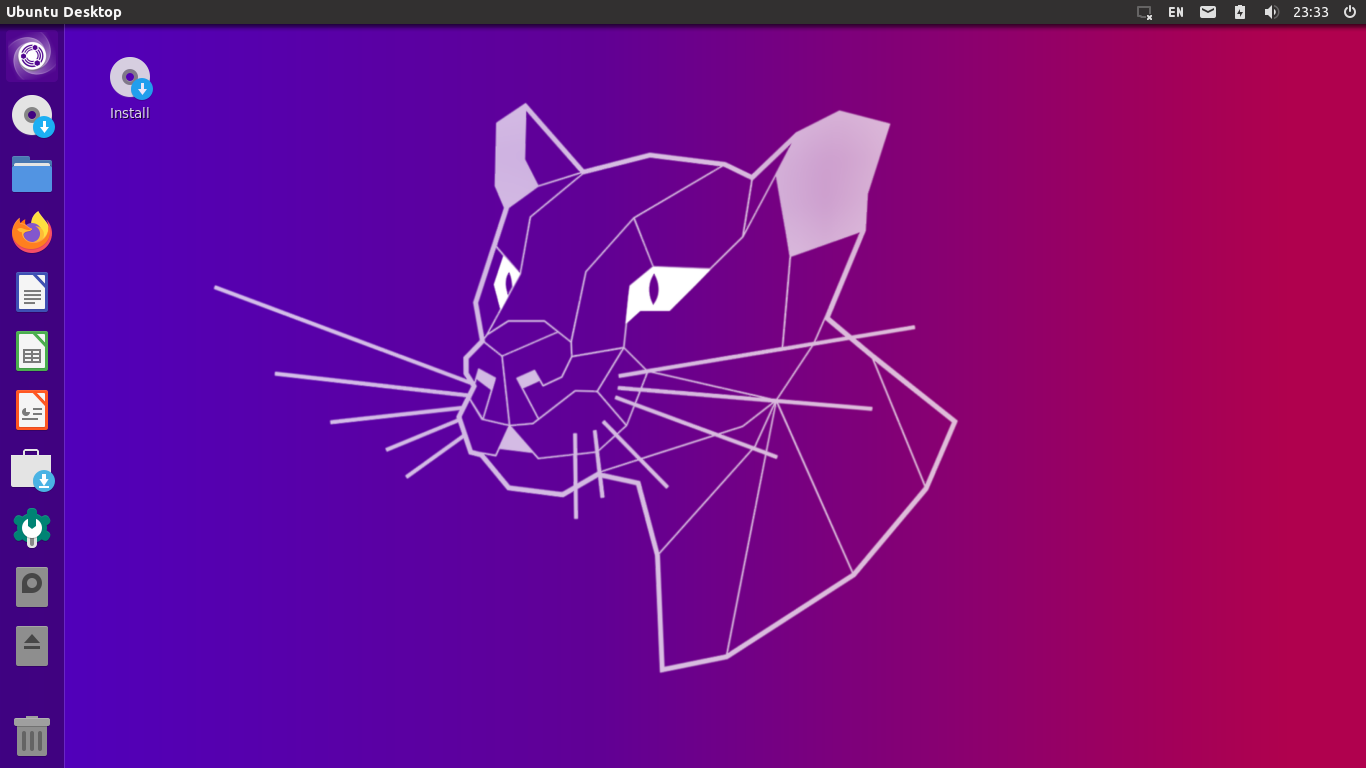
Ubuntu Unity 20.04 LTS default desktop

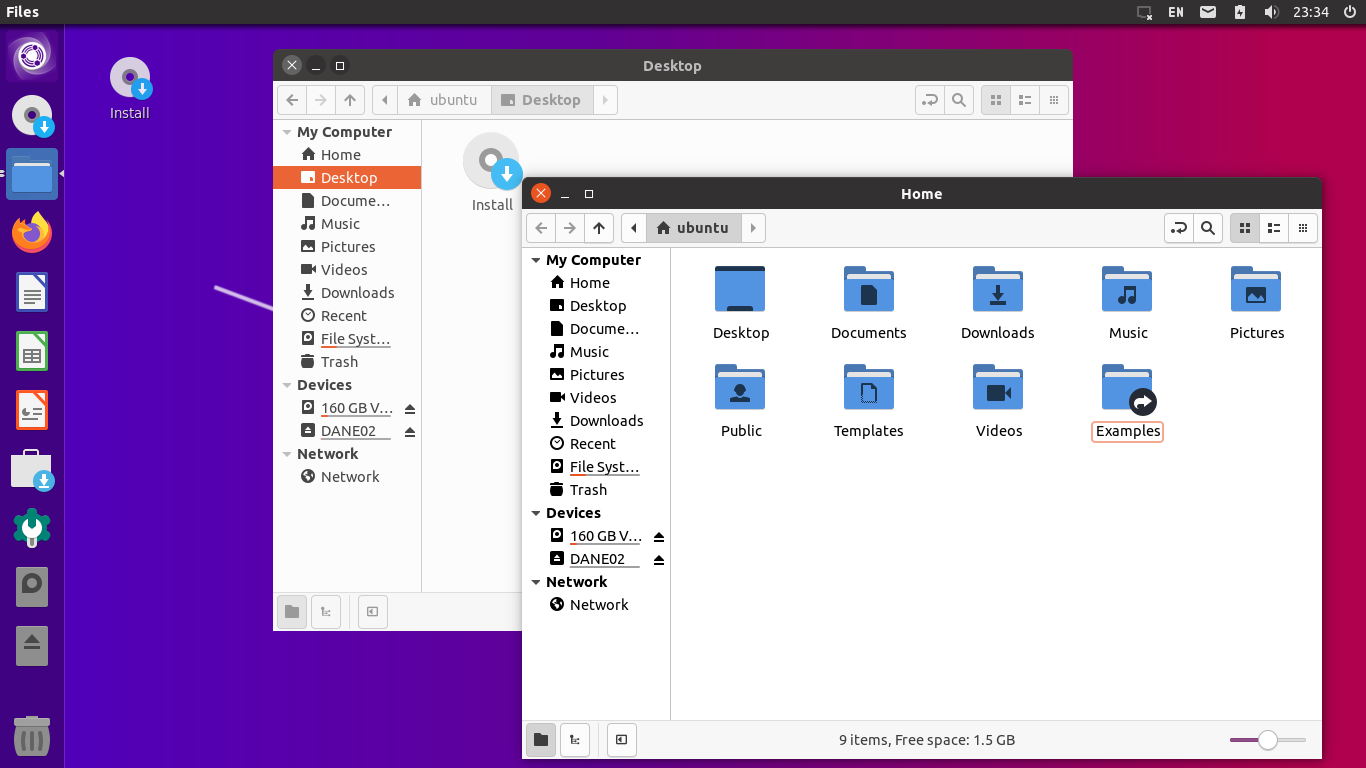
Ubuntu Unity 20.04 LTS with the default Yaru theme

This release was the first Ubuntu Unity release, as well as the first long-term support release. It was released on 7 May 2020, two weeks after the release of Ubuntu 20.04 LTS. It uses a default Yaru theme with Papirus icons with Adwaita, Ambiance, Radiance and High Contrast themes available.

This initial release attracted the attention of the tech press and was widely reported.

In a review in Forbes, Jason Evangelho stated, "If you're yearning for the good ole' Unity and Compiz days, I bring awesome tidings: someone's shining a new spotlight on them, and the stage underneath is a brand new Linux distribution called Ubuntu Unity Remix 20.04".

Jack Wallen of TechRepublic wrote, "Unity is back as is your ticket out of a world of inefficient desktop interfaces that made using a laptop a less-than-ideal proposition. For those who've lauded Ubuntu's choice to switch to GNOME, fear not—Ubuntu is sticking with GNOME. Unity, on the other hand, has made its return, thanks to the likes of the Ubuntu Unity desktop distribution. It's a fresh take on an old, once defunct favorite".

Marius Nestor reviewed the release in 9to5Linux, stating, "I took Ubuntu Unity Remix 20.04 for a spin and it brought back good old memories for me. The spin looks great and works like a charm".

Eric Londo of Linux++ reviewed the new release, saying, "Yes, this was the old Unity I used to know and love, but somehow it felt fresher. As I worked to regain muscle memory over the key-bindings (GNOME really can take over the way you control your system XD), the experience was smooth, graceful, and fun in a way that is unique to the Unity experience. During the testing, I did not encounter a single issue that I would deem detrimental or even annoying. Everything from the Dash to the file manager and theming appeared to be just where it had left off, not skipping a beat. Congratulations to Rudra Saraswat on bringing Ubuntu Unity back to life".

Adam Hunt of Full Circle, wrote, "this release can't be termed "groundbreaking" or "a game-changer", but it does show exactly where the mainstream Ubuntu could have been today if it had not left Unity 7 behind for the Gnome Shell".

The first point release was made on 6 August 2020, on the same day as the other Ubuntu flavours and included fixes for a number of small issues.

A 19 October 2020 review by John Perkins in Make Tech Easier faulted the release for its high idle CPU and RAM use, and noted, "the main thing that sticks out as a con to me is the wallflower factor. Nothing about Unity really sticks out. Aside from the search function, the appearance, look and feel of Unity doesn't have anything special enough to keep me coming back".

=== Ubuntu Unity 20.10 ===
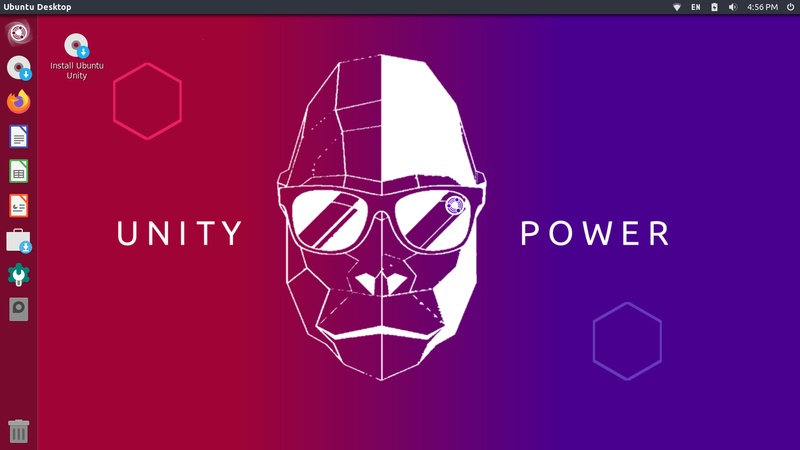
Ubuntu Unity 20.10

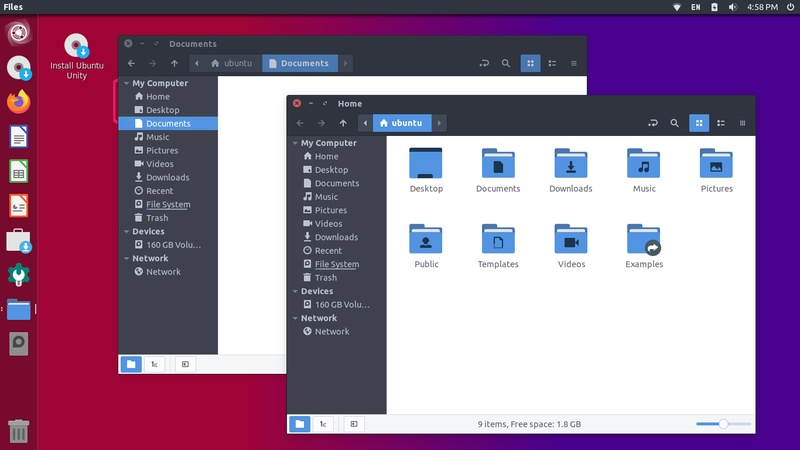
Ubuntu Unity 20.10 with the default Arc-darker theme

This standard release came out on 22 October 2020.

The version incorporates Linux kernel version 5.8 and uses GNU GRUB for both BIOS and UEFI booting. It also adds fixes and updates for many user interface issue, including adding the Compiz settings manager, with many plugins and effects. It also introduces a new default theme of Arc-darker, new wallpaper and a new Yaru-Purple theme and icon theme.

In a review of the first alpha version, Marius Nestor wrote in 9to5 Linux, "I took it for a test drive, and, to my surprise, everything works a lot faster than version 20.04".

A review of the final release on Debug Point, Arandam Giri praised Ubuntu Unity's efficiency and how it improved user productivity.

A January 2021 review in Full Circle magazine noted: "Ubuntu Unity 20.10 is a very strong release. It builds on the success and all the tech press attention that the first release garnered and shows developer commitment to taking Ubuntu Unity further, with the goal of gaining official status. Adding the CompizConfig Settings Manager, more window and icon themes, and a wide array of wallpaper choices, plus settling on Thunderbird for email and Nemo as the default file manager, shows that this development cycle is going to be focused on sharpening the user experience. This makes it worth tracking this distribution along the road to the next LTS version, 22.04 LTS, due out in April 2022. If this release is any indication, we should see good things in the future".

=== Ubuntu Unity 21.04 ===
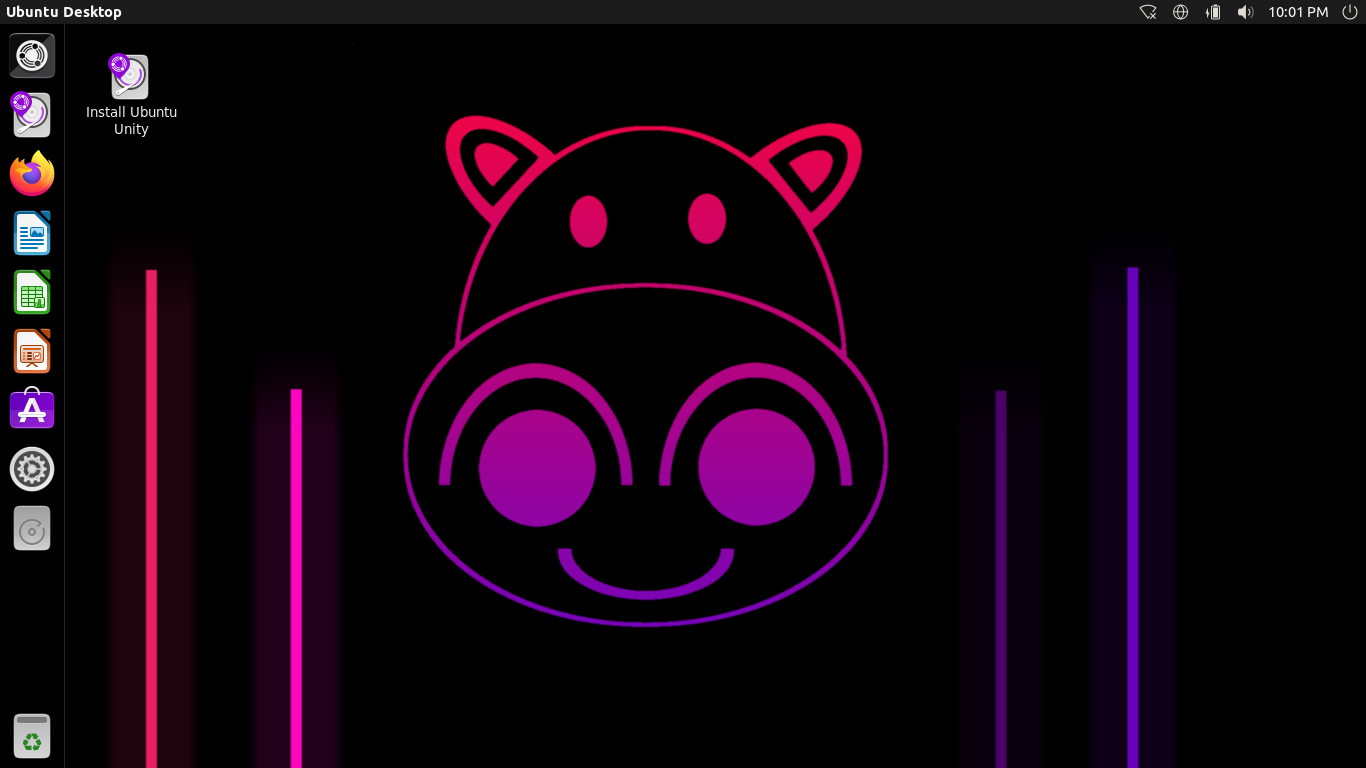
Ubuntu Unity 21.04

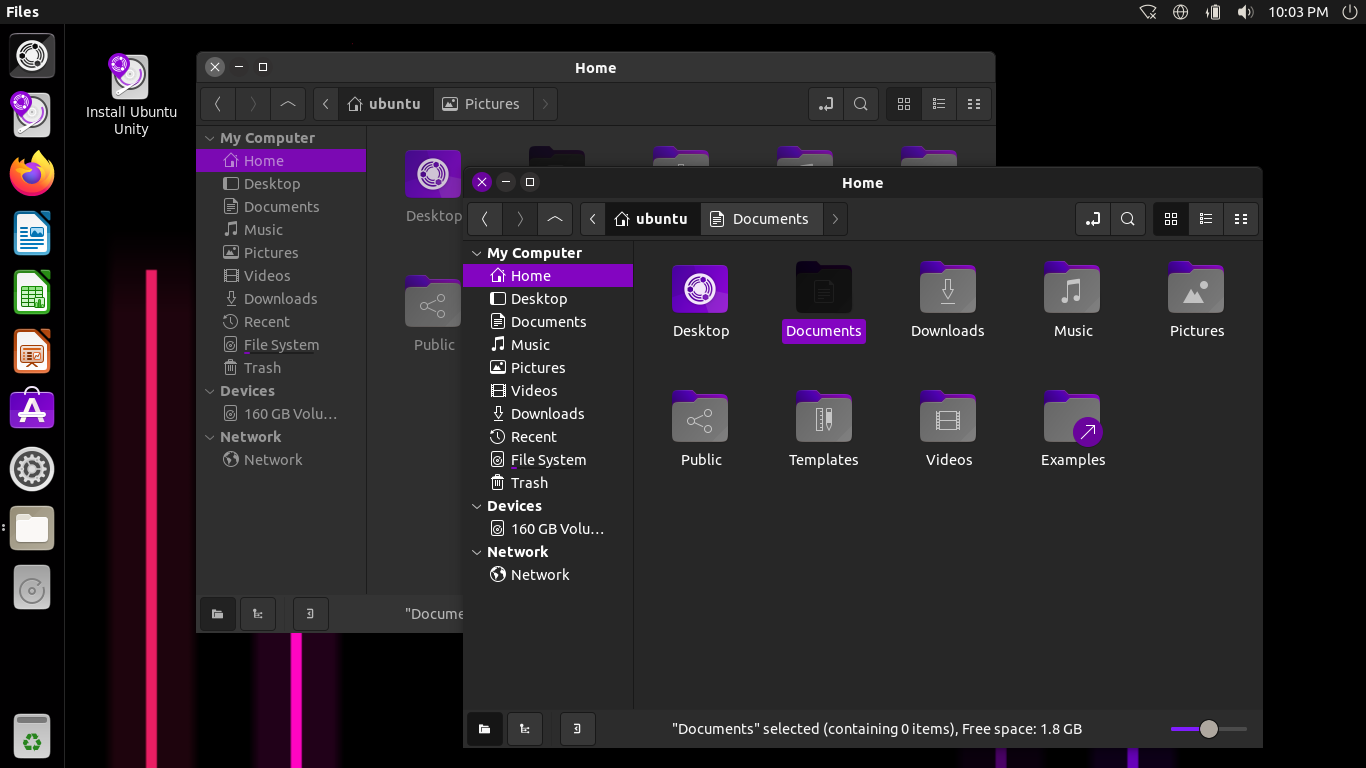
Ubuntu Unity 21.04 with the default Yaru-unity-dark theme

Ubuntu Unity 21.04 is a standard release, made on 22 April 2021.

This version uses Linux kernel 5.11 and included a new Yaru-Unity7 theme, plus a new transparent launcher icon. It also included new wallpapers and a new Plymouth theme for boot-up, plus a few bug fixes.

Reviewer Marius Nestor noted in 9 to 5 Linux, "Ubuntu Unity 21.04 is here to give fans of the good old Unity 7 desktop environment a much-improved experience by shipping with a new Yaru-Unity7 dark theme that features a transparent launcher icon, a new Plymouth boot splash theme, as well as new wallpapers based on the Hirsute Hippo mascot. Various apps have been updated to their latest release, and other received bug fixes to work better, such as the GNOME system monitor app. In addition, this release adds the missing notifications for volume and brightness changes, and improves support for Snap apps".

A review in the August 2021 issue of Full Circle, concluded, "Ubuntu Unity 21.04 is another strong release from the development team. The focus of this development cycle has been on including more user 'look and feel' choices, while providing the efficient Unity 7 interface and a good range of applications. It is a formula that seems to be working, as each release, so far, has accumulated improvements".

=== Ubuntu Unity 21.10 ===
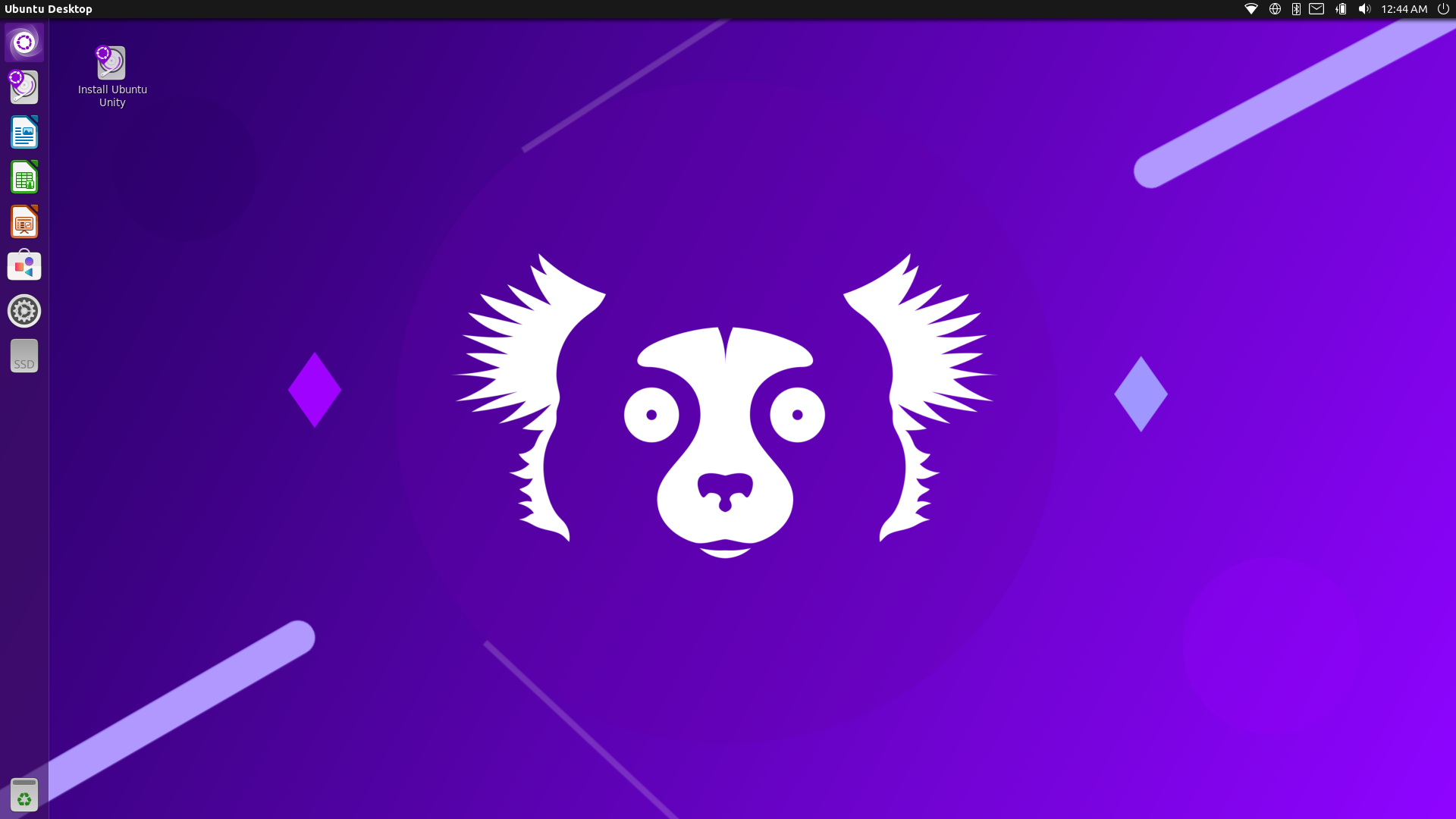
Ubuntu Unity 21.10

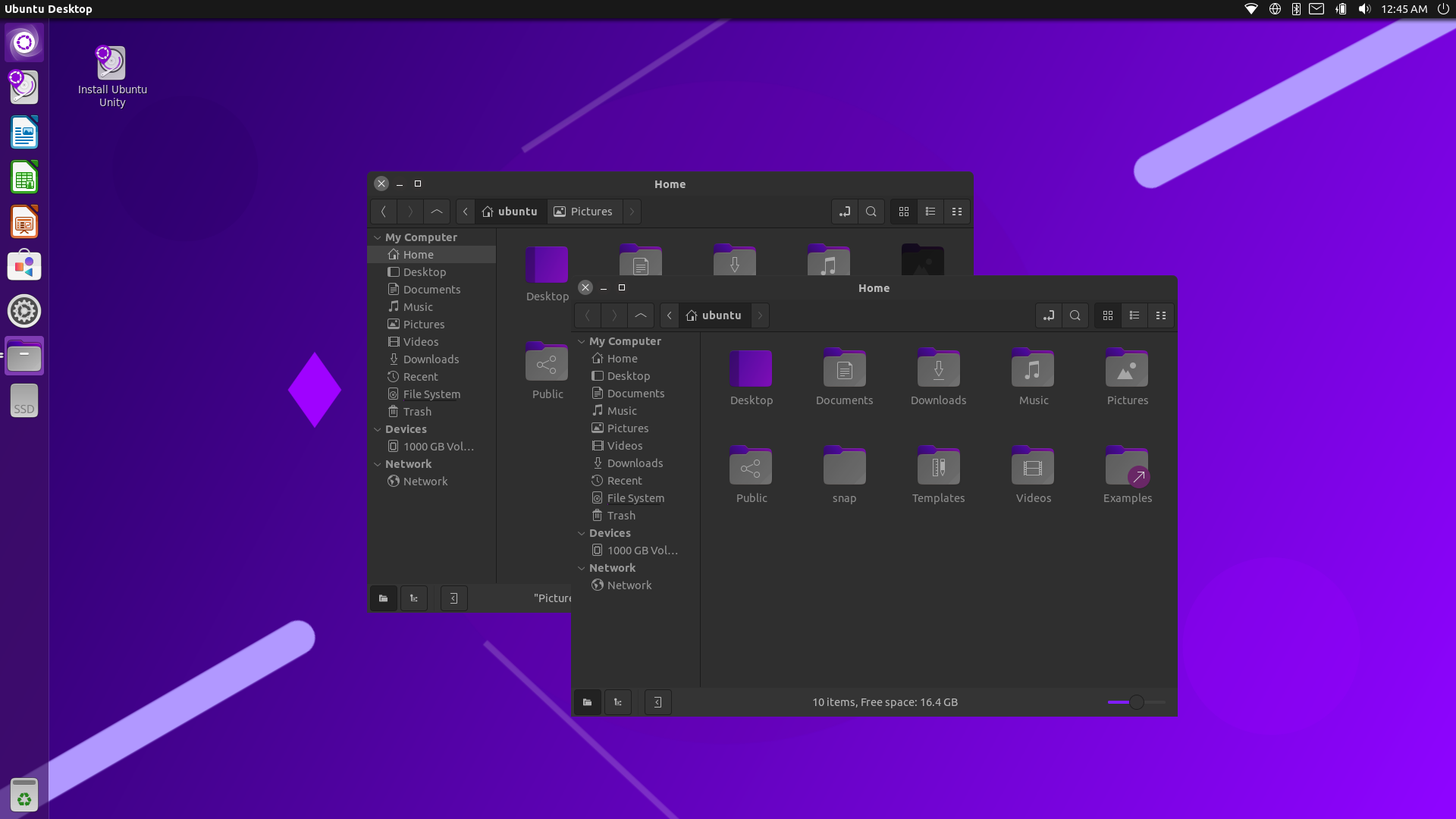
Ubuntu Unity 21.10 with the default Yaru-unity-dark theme

Ubuntu Unity 21.10 is a standard release, that came out on 14 October 2021.

This release included an updated version of the Unity user interface from version 7.5.0 to 7.5.1, incorporating updated indicators and migration of the glib-2.0 schemas to the gsettings-ubuntu-schemas.

Ubuntu Unity 21.10 uses the Snap version of the Firefox web browser, in place of the previous Deb version, a move that matches Ubuntu 21.10. A new Plymouth splash screen and new artwork were introduced, including the default Indri-themed wallpaper.

The project also adopted a new simplified Ubuntu Unity logo by Muqtadir and Allan Carvalho.

This release also marked the start of migration of the project to GitLab and the design of a new website, due to expanding need and increased traffic. The developers also indicated the project was beginning a move to the lol Snap store, as an alternative to the existing Canonical Snap store at snapcraft.io.

A review in the February 2022 edition of Full Circle noted, "Ubuntu Unity 21.10 is not as strong a release as was expected and has some outstanding issues that were present at the time of its release. The lack of the Unity Tweak Tool, installed by default or even that can be installed and run, means that the themes provided cannot be properly accessed. I think it is okay to put out a "standard" release that has unsolved bugs like this, but the developers need to clearly explain the issue in the release announcement and indicate when it is expected to be fixed".

=== Ubuntu Unity 22.04 LTS ===
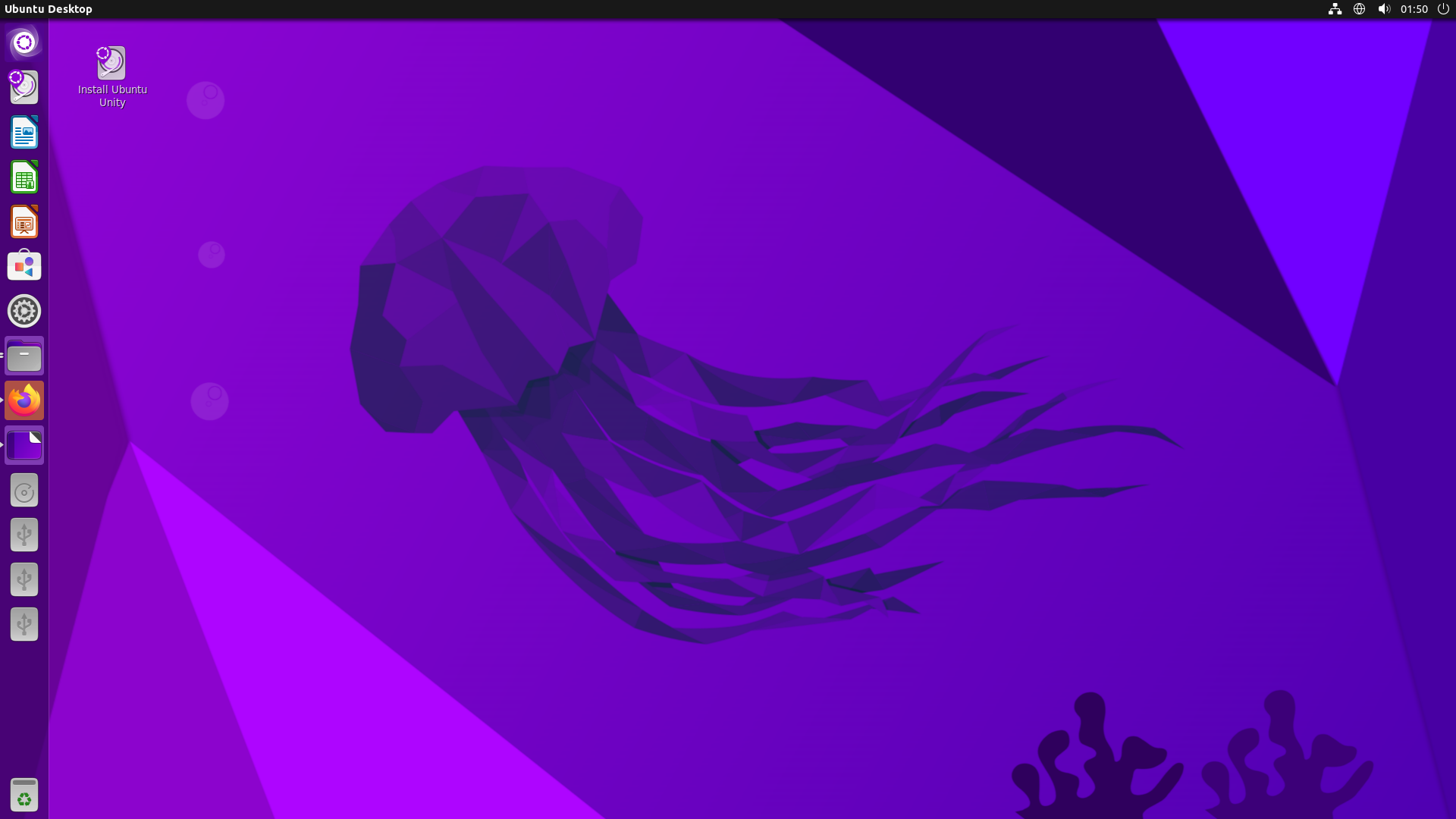
Ubuntu Unity 22.04

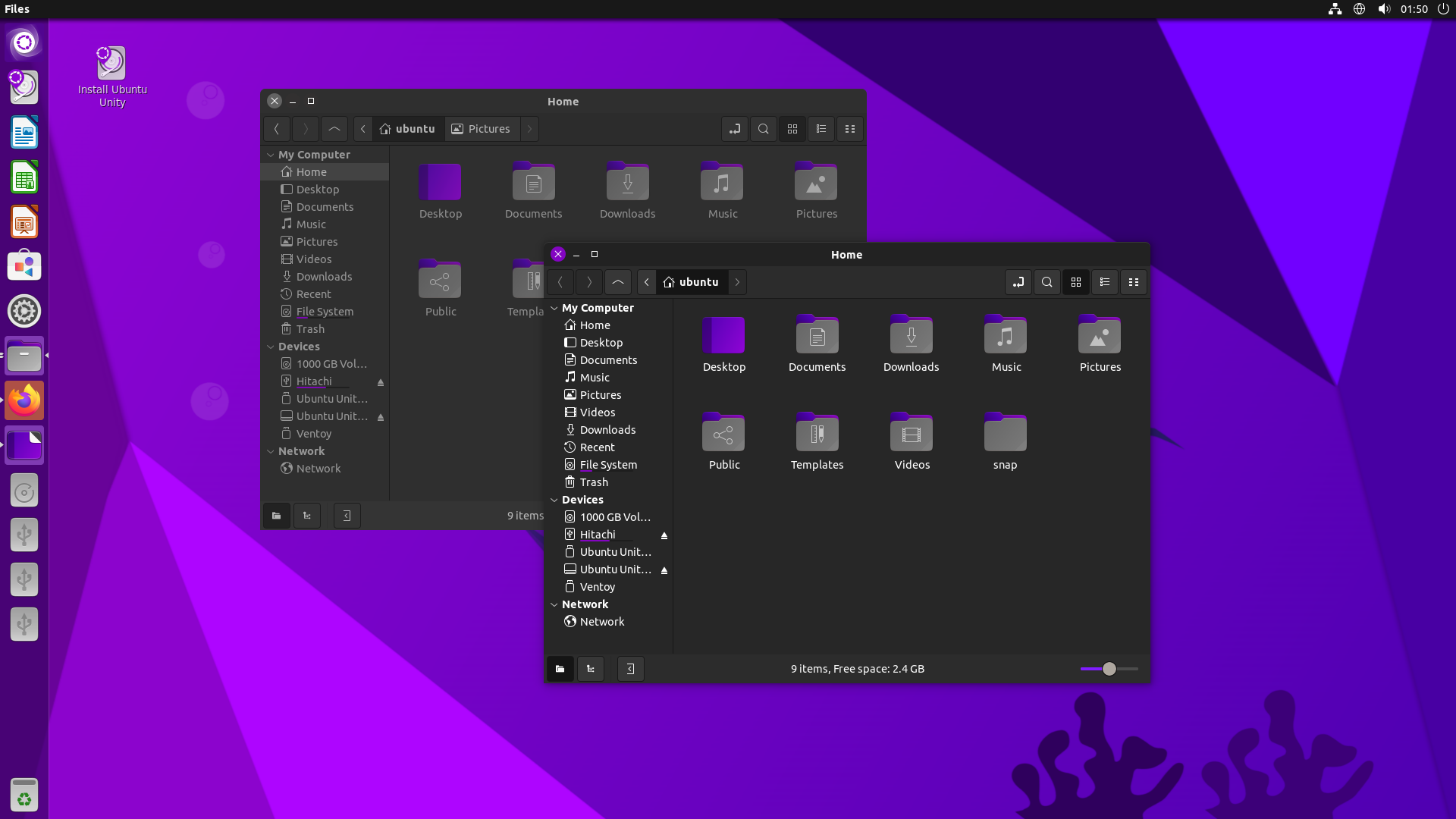
Ubuntu Unity 22.04 LTS with the default Yaru-unity-dark theme

This fifth release of Ubuntu Unity was made on 21 April 2022 and is a long term support release, supported for three years, until April 2025.

Changes in this release include adding Flatpak and the Flathub repositories by default. Different installation files for BIOS and UEFI hardware have been merged into one .ISO file download, too.

A number of application changes were made, with MATE applications largely replacing GNOME ones. The Atril PDF viewer replaced Evince, pluma text editor replaced gedit, Eye of MATE image viewer replaced Eye of GNOME, the MATE System monitor replaced GNOME System Monitor and VLC media player replaced GNOME Videos. As well as Synaptic and GDebi were removed.

A review in Full Circle magazine noted. "Ubuntu Unity 22.04 LTS is a solid release with no obvious bad habits or issues identified. The return of the Unity Tweak Tool is a welcome addition to this release, as it works well, and this means Ubuntu Unity 22.04 LTS is better than its predecessor, 21.10. Ubuntu Unity continues to offer its users a lot of customization choices, plus a unique mix of default applications from the GNOME and MATE desktops".

=== Ubuntu Unity 22.10 ===
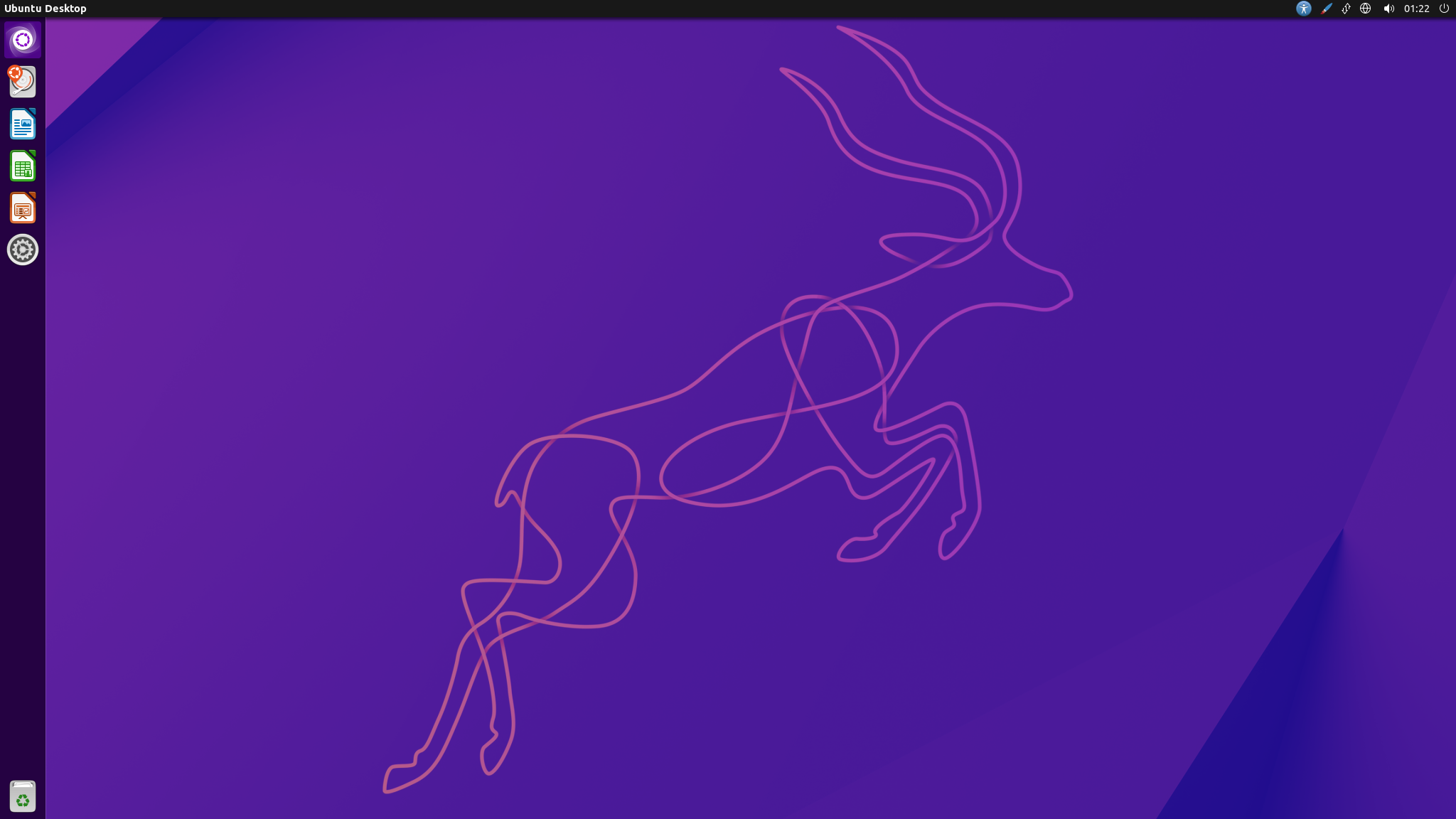
Ubuntu Unity 22.10

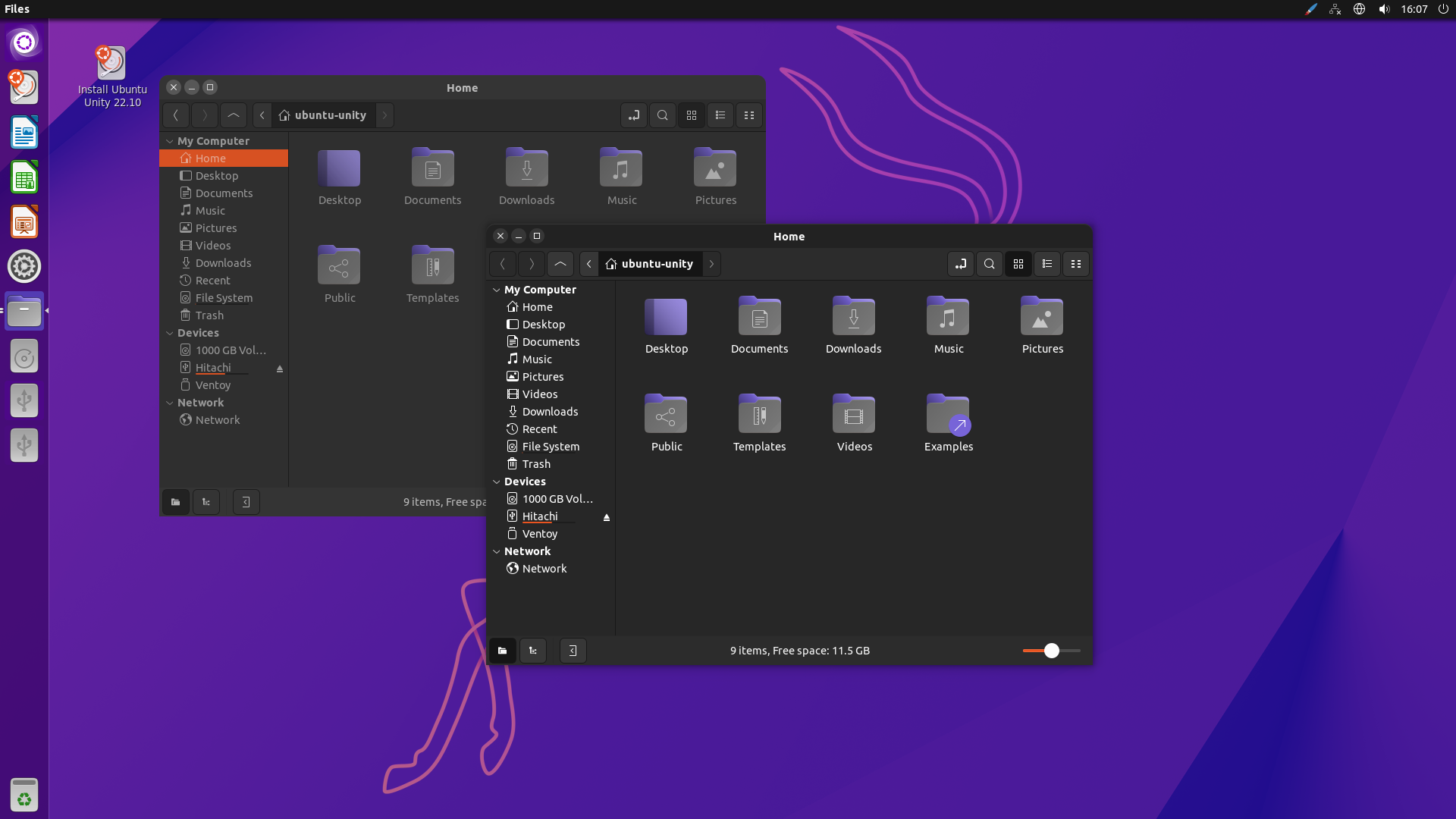
Ubuntu Unity 22.10 with the default Yaru-unity-dark theme

Ubuntu Unity 22.10 is the first release as an official flavor and was released on 20 October 2022.

As the first release as an official Ubuntu flavour, Ubuntu Unity 22.10 was hosted on the Canonical's official service, cdimage.ubuntu.com. It also completed the move from libadwaita applications to MATE desktop alternatives. Unity packages were moved to hosting as Ubuntu "Universe" packages and the Ubuntu Unity desktop could also be installed on other Ubuntu flavours by simply adding the ubuntu-unity-desktop metapackage.

An It's FOSS review in September 2022 before the final release had been made, noted, "the young developer Rudra Saraswat started (another) new distribution called Ubuntu Unity Remix back in 2020. It was built on top of Ubuntu 20.04 LTS with the same Unity 7 that was abandoned by Ubuntu. I ignored it. It was just the old Unity with Ubuntu 20.04 as base. A code untouched for three years? I saw no reasons to use it. And it went on like that for almost two years. No changes were made to the Unity code base. But then in June 2022, for the first time in six years, a new version of Unity was released. In my opinion, it was the first time the project showed real progress. It was no longer just a combination of the same old Unity code with a new Ubuntu base. There was actual code development."

An October 2022, review in DebugPoint concluded, "Ubuntu Unity 22.10, being official, is a promising start for the Unity desktop to become more mature. From the development viewpoint, a colossal amount of work awaits to make it to UnityX (the next version of 7). Also, it only supports X.Org and no Wayland at the moment. Wayland might be a deal breaker for some users to adopt this as a daily driver for performance-centric workloads. That being said, Ubuntu Unity 22.10 is perfect for the average user for everyday work and perfect for smaller display form factors. If you like the Unity design, HUD search, global menu, and left action buttons – then it's for you."

A Full Circle magazine review from April 2023, found fault with the scattered locations and inconsistent nature of the desktop user settings and also the rapid dropping and then re-adding of default applications over the past few releases, saying "all this undocumented switching out of applications in recent releases is a bit bewildering from a user point of view. Applications disappear only to reappear in the next release with no explanation why. It doesn't really feel like there is a plan here."

=== Ubuntu Unity 23.04 ===
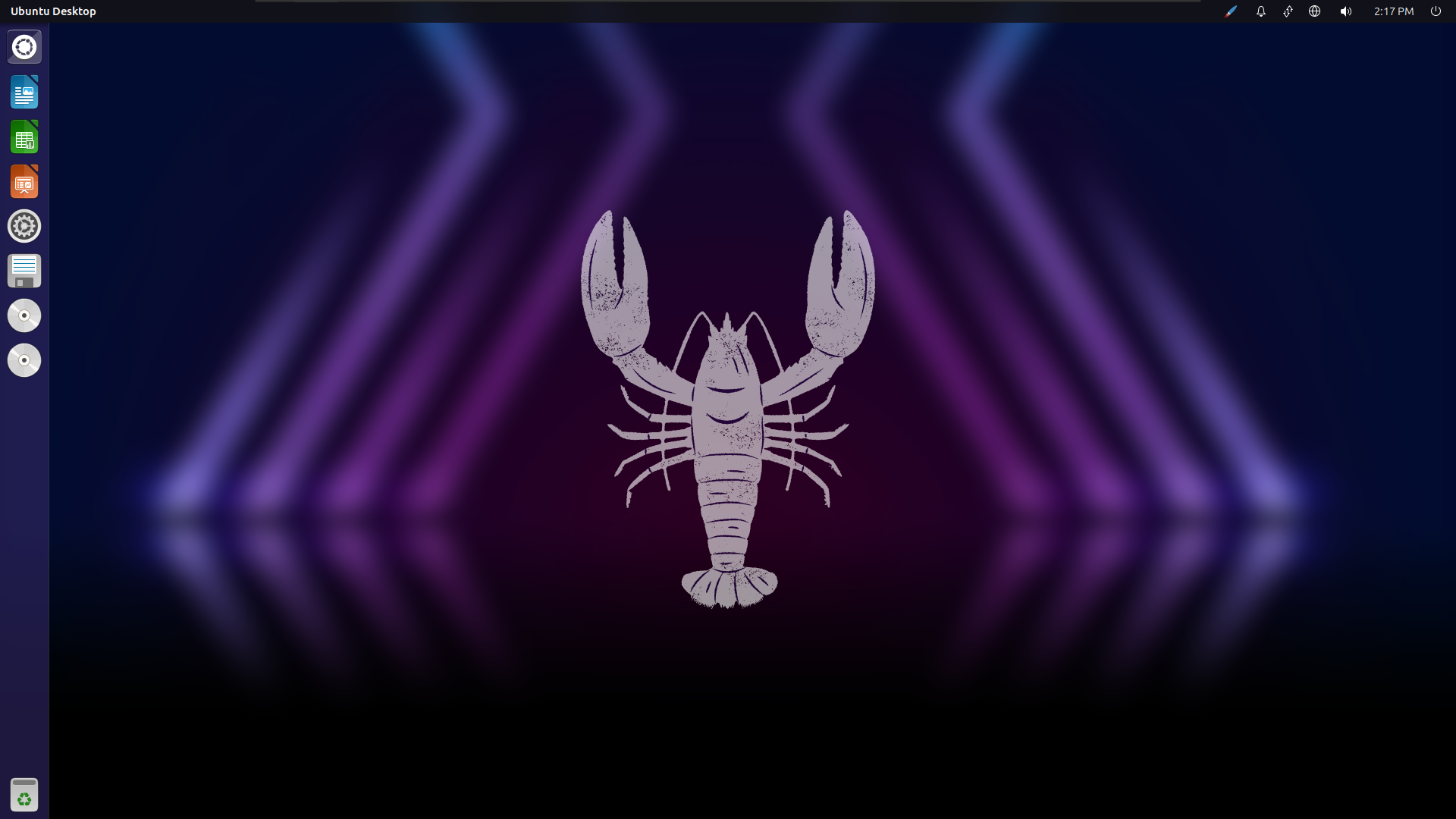
Ubuntu Unity 23.04

Ubuntu Unity 23.04 is an interim release that was first made available on 20 April 2023. It is the first distribution to come with the Unity 7.7 desktop out-of-the-box, bringing a new dash similar to that displayed in concepts described in Ubuntu 16.04, improvements to the panel and the implementation of 'UWidgets'. It also comes with a drastically improved Settings app and visual improvements to the launcher.

Ubuntu Unity 23.04 was supported for 9 months until January 2024.

=== Ubuntu Unity 23.10 ===
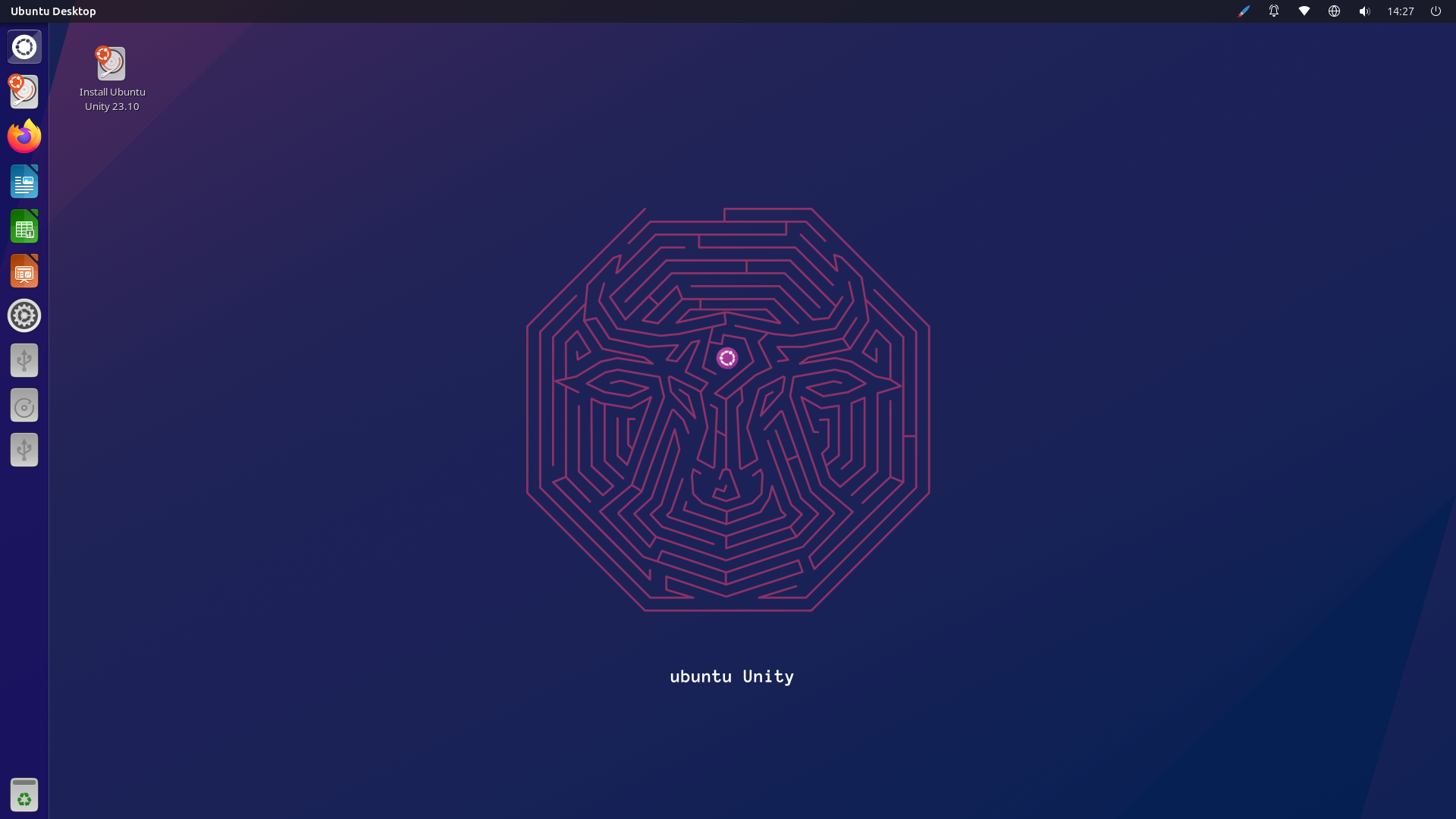
Ubuntu Unity 23.10

Ubuntu 23.10 was released on 12 October 2023 and was supported for nine months until July 2024.

There were no major changes or features in this build, and was just an iteration of base Ubuntu and not from the Unity desktop or application set included.

=== Ubuntu Unity 24.04 LTS ===
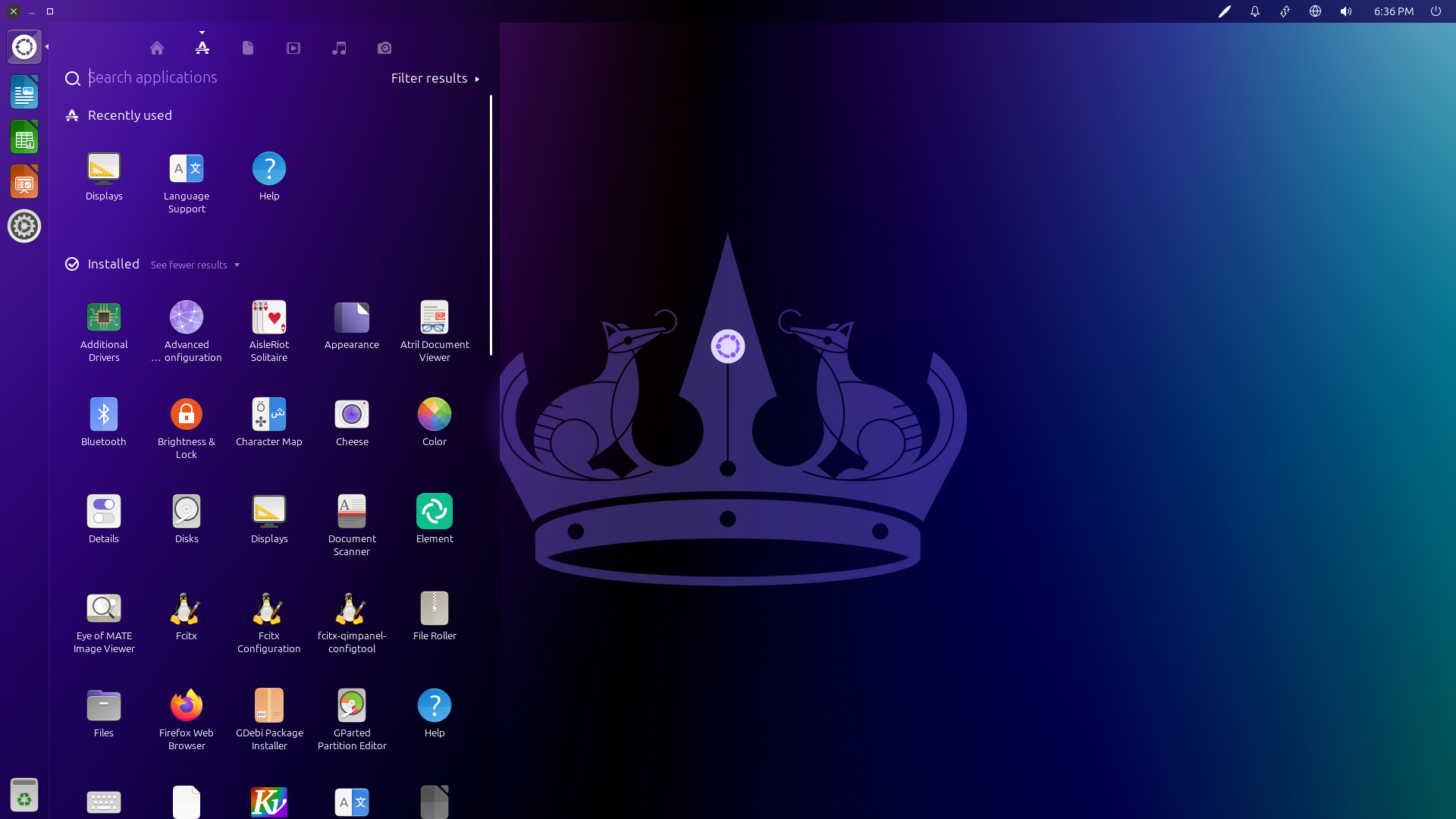
Ubuntu Unity 24.04 LTS

The third LTS version was released on 25 April 2024. This release includes an early version of Ubuntu Unity which uses the Lomiri user interface. The version of Unity in this is Unity 7.7, meaning it's the same old base Unity with the dash slightly modified to look a little like Lomiri or Unity8 interface.

=== Ubuntu Unity 24.10 ===
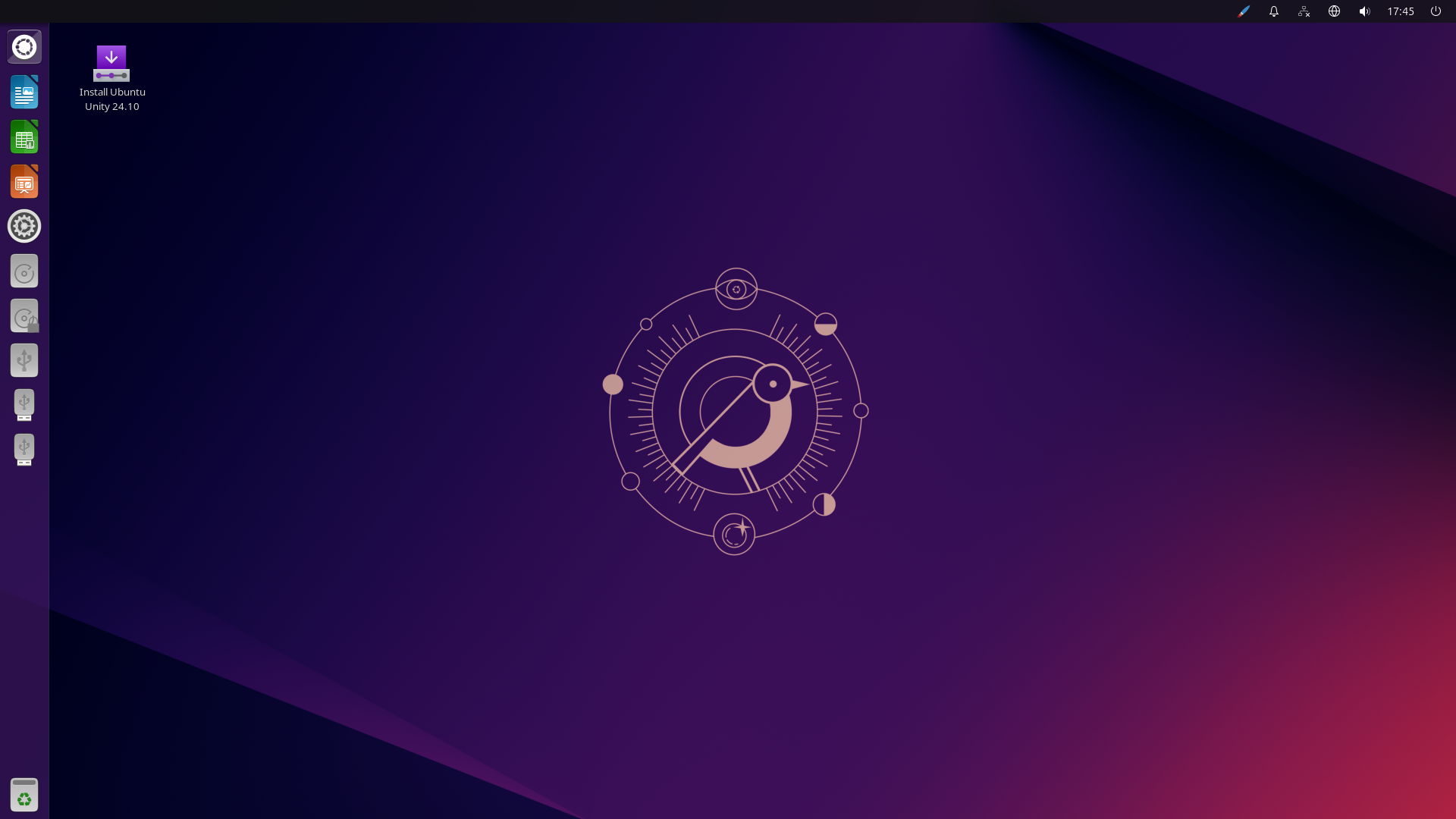
Ubuntu Unity 24.10

Ubuntu 24.10 was released on 10 October 2024 and was supported for nine months until July 2025.

=== Ubuntu Unity 25.04 ===
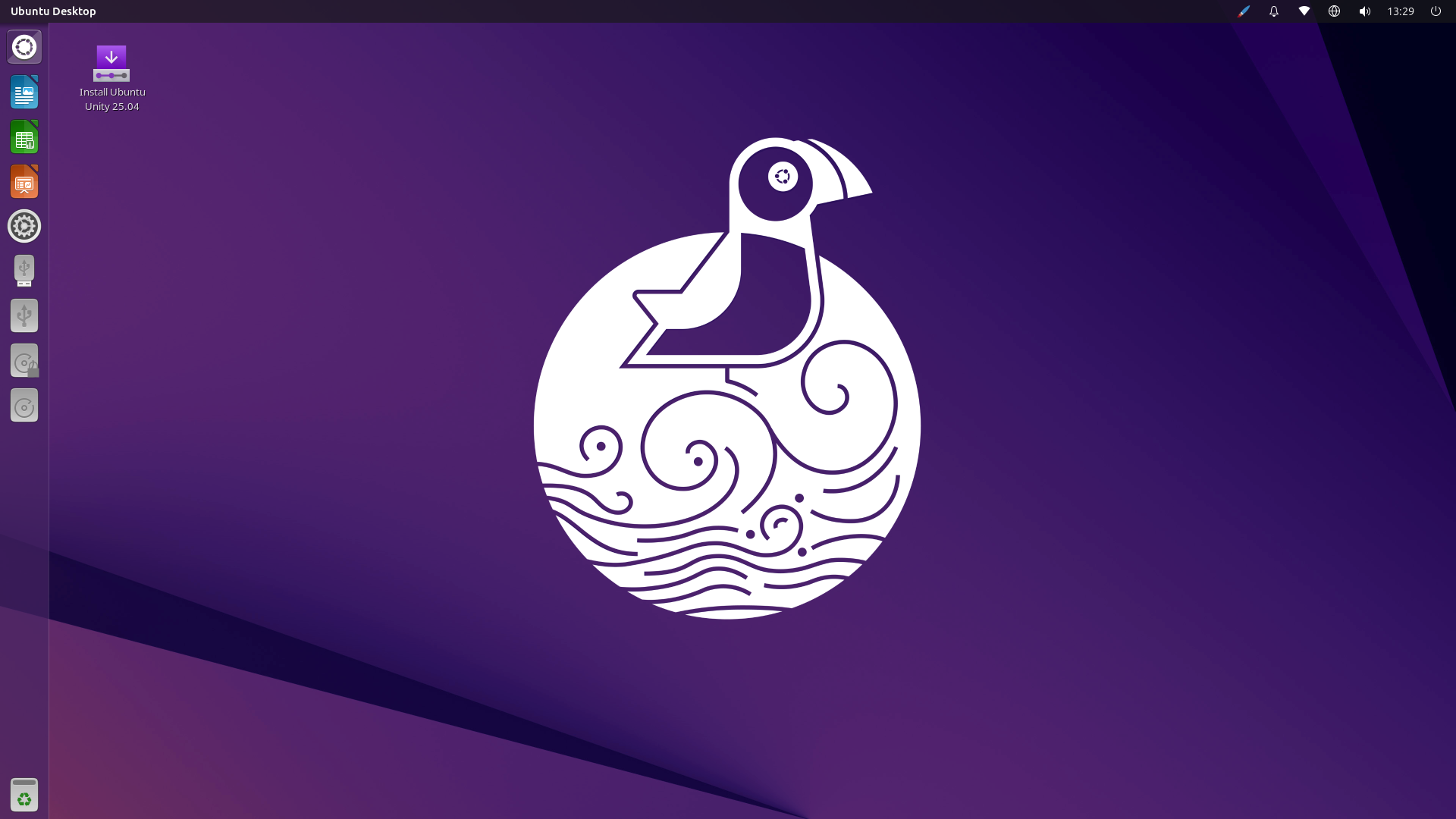
Ubuntu Unity 25.04

Ubuntu 25.04 was released on 17 April 2025 and was supported for nine months until January 2026.

=== Ubuntu Unity 25.10 ===
Due to last minute unresolvable issues, there was no Ubuntu 25.10 release made.

Many bugs were reported, the prominent ones were:

- Network Indicator Applet not loading.
- Unity-greeter issues.
- Dependencies not resolved as the Unity development was not happening due to personal commitments of the developers and testers, i.e., Saraswat and Maik.

=== Ubuntu Unity 26.04 ===
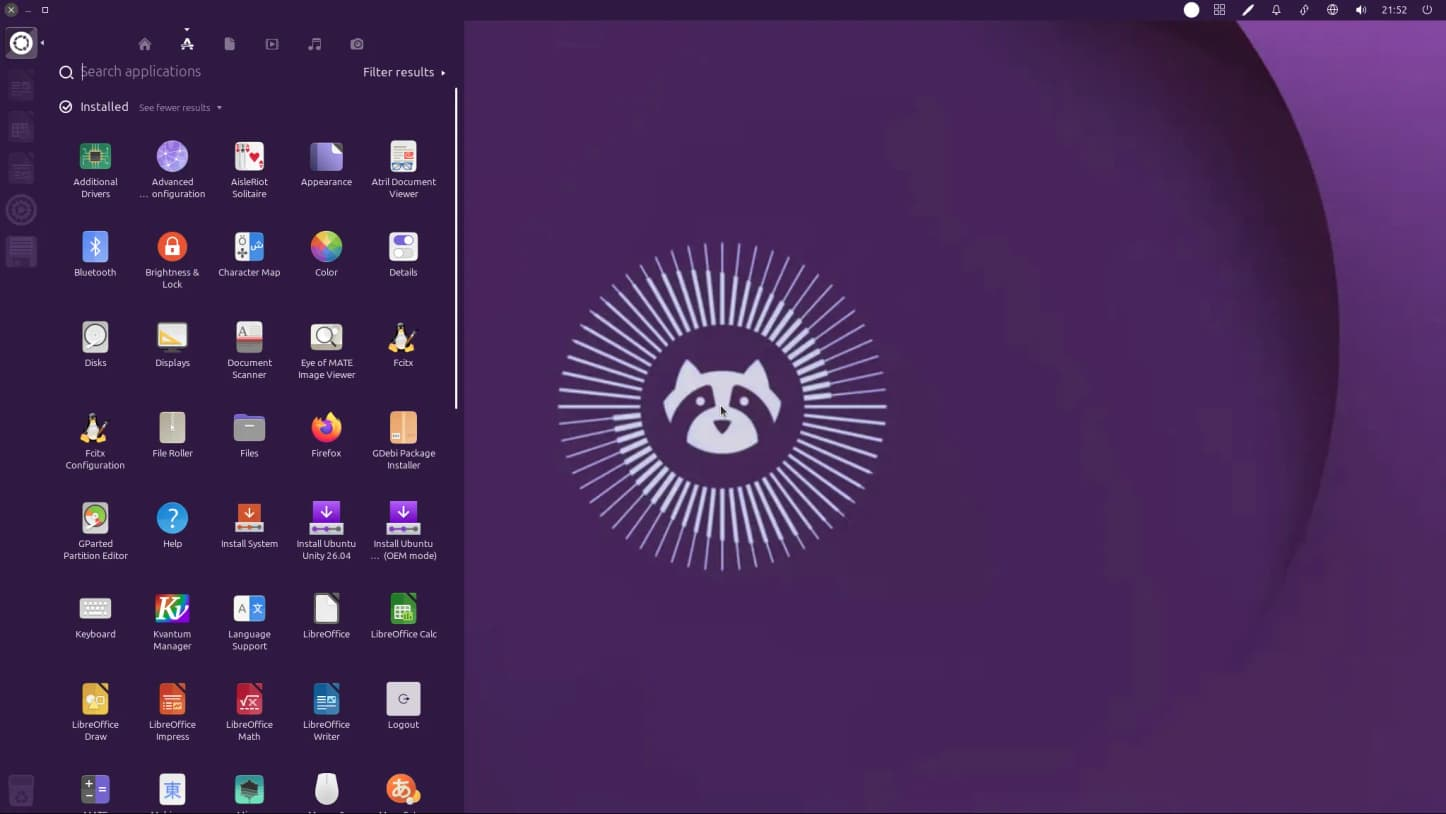
Ubuntu Unity 26.04 Desktop running Unity 7.7.1

Ubuntu Unity 26.04 is the latest version, released on 23 April 2026. It is not a long term support release. It features Linux 7.0, Unity 7.7.1, and is the first release to be released during Rudra's and Maik's absence.

== Applications ==
Some of the applications included by default in Ubuntu Unity are:

- Cheese webcam application
- CUPS printing system
- Document Viewer (Evince) PDF viewer
- Document Scanner (Simple Scan) optical scanner
- Firefox web browser
- Geary email client
- GNOME Calendar desktop calendar
- GNOME Disks disk manager
- GNOME Files (Nautilus) file manager
- GNOME Terminal terminal emulator
- GNOME Videos (Totem) movie player
- GParted partition editor
- Image Viewer (Eye of GNOME) image viewer
- LibreOffice office suite
- Nemo file manager
- PulseAudio audio controller
- Remmina remote desktop client
- Rhythmbox music player
- Shotwell photo manager
- Startup Disk Creator USB ISO writer
- Text Editor (gedit) text editor
- Thunderbird email client
- Transmission bit torrent client
- Ubuntu Software (GNOME Software) package management system
- Unity Tweak Tool settings manager

== Table of releases ==
Version	Code name	Release date	Supported until	Remarks
20.04 LTS	Focal Fossa	7 May 2020	April 2023	No Longer Supported
20.10	Groovy Gorilla	22 October 2020	July 2021	No Longer Supported
21.04	Hirsute Hippo	22 April 2021	January 2022	No Longer Supported
21.10	Impish Indri	14 October 2021	July 2022	No Longer Supported
22.04 LTS	Jammy Jellyfish	21 April 2022	April 2025	No Longer Supported
22.10	Kinetic Kudu	20 October 2022	July 2023	No Longer Supported
23.04	Lunar Lobster	20 April 2023	January 2024	No Longer Supported
23.10	Mantic Minotaur	12 October 2023	July 2024	No Longer Supported
24.04 LTS	Noble Numbat	25 April 2024	April 2027	Current LTS version
24.10	Oracular Oriole	10 October 2024	July 2025	No Longer Supported
25.04	Plucky Puffin	17 April 2025	January 2026	No Longer Supported
25.10	Questing Quokka	N/A	N/A	Unreleased
26.04	Resolute Raccoon	23 April 2026	April 2031 (If supported by team)	Not LTS, but will be supported as if it was by the team
26.10	Stonking Stingray	15 October 2026	July 2027	Current interim release
Old version Older version, still maintained Latest version Future release Unreleased

== See also ==
- List of Linux distributions
- Lubuntu
- Xubuntu
- Ubuntu Budgie
