= Unity (user interface) =

Graphical user interface for Ubuntu

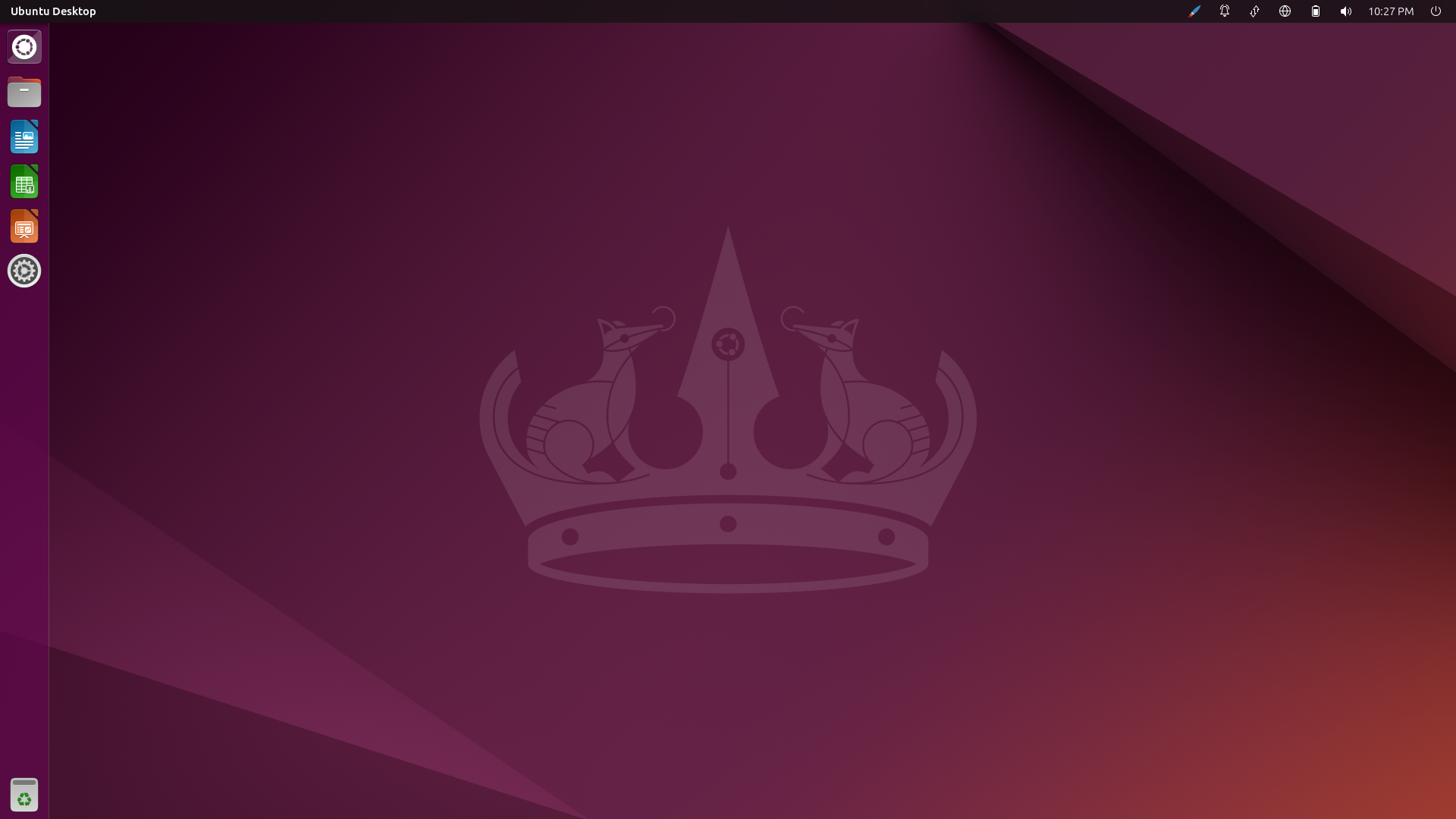
- Unity 7.7, running on Ubuntu 24.04
- Original author: Canonical Ltd.
- Developer: Unity7 Maintainers
- Release: June 9, 2010; 16 years ago
- Stable release: 7.7 / December 24, 2022; 3 years ago
- Written in: Unity 2D: C++, JavaScript, QML; 2.0–7.4: C, C++, Python, Vala; UnityX: Fish (Halted)
- Operating system: Ubuntu Unity
- Type: Graphical shell
- License: GPL v3, LGPL v3
- Website: unityd.org
- Repository: code.launchpad.net/unity; gitlab.com/ubuntu-unity/unity-x

Unity is a graphical shell originally developed by Canonical Ltd. for its Ubuntu operating system. It debuted in 2010 in the netbook edition of Ubuntu 10.10 and was used until Ubuntu 17.10. Following its discontinuation by Canonical in 2017, development of forks of Unity7 and Unity8 has continued – the latter was renamed Lomiri in February 2020.

Unity7 is the default desktop environment in Ubuntu Unity, an official flavor of Ubuntu since 2022. The maintainers of Ubuntu Unity and Unity7 have started working on the successor of Unity7, UnityX.

It was part of the Ayatana project, an initiative with the stated intention of improving the user experience within Ubuntu. It was initially designed to make more efficient use of space given the limited screen size of netbooks, including, for example, a vertical application switcher called the launcher, and a space-saving horizontal multipurpose top menu bar. Unlike GNOME, KDE Plasma, Xfce, or LXDE, Unity is not a collection of applications. It is designed to use existing programs.

== Features ==
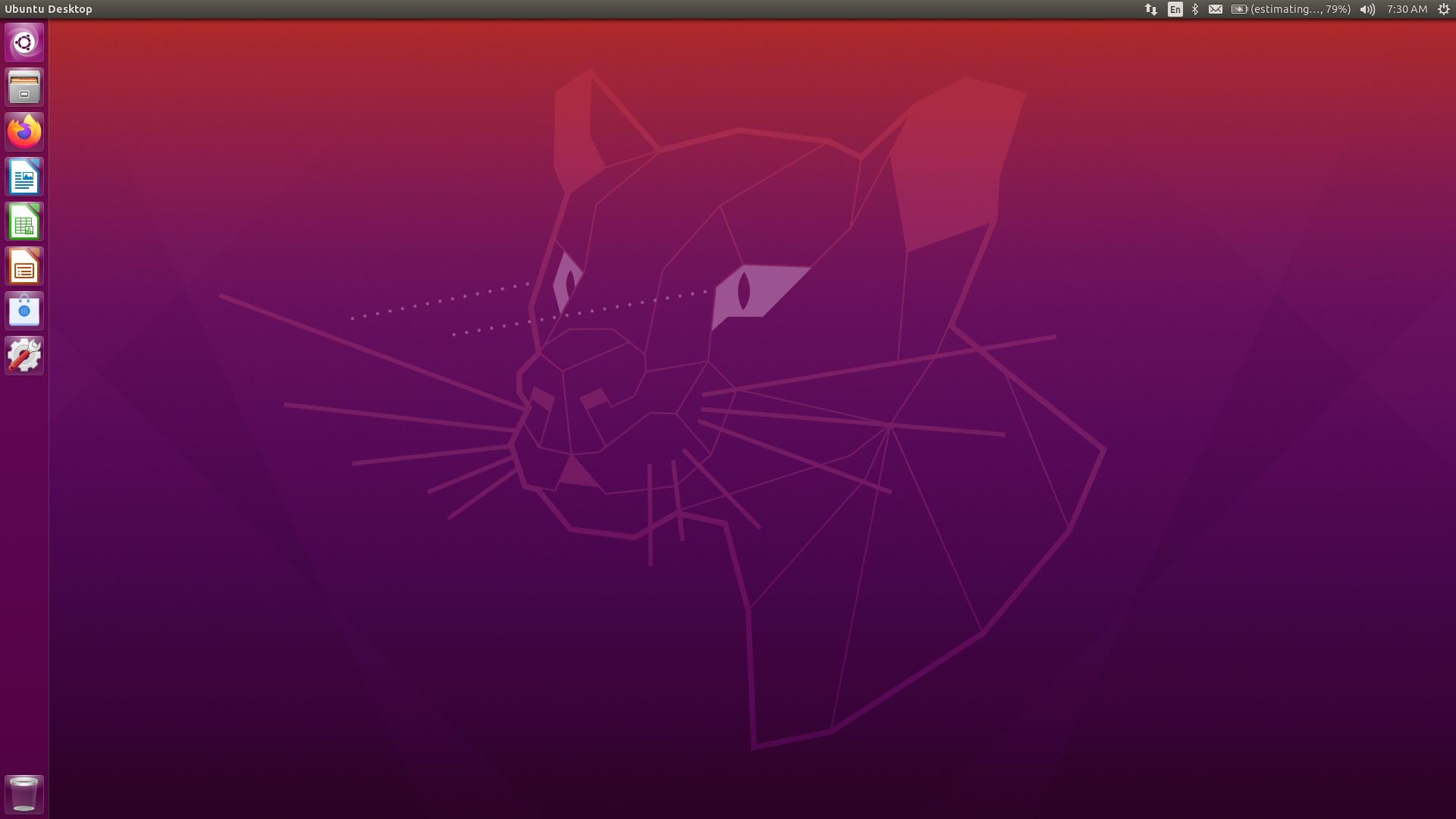
Unity Desktop, pre-Ubuntu Unity redesign, if installed in Ubuntu 22.04 LTS and below. This screenshot is specifically running Unity 7.5.1, on Ubuntu 20.04.

The Unity user interface consists of several components:

- Top menu bar: a multipurpose top bar, saving space, and containing:
  1. the menu bar of the active application
  2. the title bar of the main window of the active application, including the maximize, minimize and exit buttons
  3. the session menu, including the global system settings, logout, and shut down
  4. the diverse global notification indicators including the time, weather, and the state of the underlying system.
- Launcher: a taskbar. Multiple instances of an application are grouped under the same icon, with an indicator showing how many instances are open. The user has a choice whether or not to lock an application to the launcher. If it is not locked, an application may be started using the Dash or via a separately installed menu.
- Quicklist: the accessible menu of launcher items
- Dash: a desktop search utility that enables searching for information both locally (e.g. installed applications, recent files, or bookmarks) and online (e.g. Twitter or Google Docs). It displays previews of the results.
- Head-up display (HUD): Allows hotkey searching for top menu bar items from the keyboard, without the need for using the mouse, by pressing and releasing the Alt key.
- Indicators: a notification area containing the clock, network status, battery status, and audio volume controls

=== Dash ===
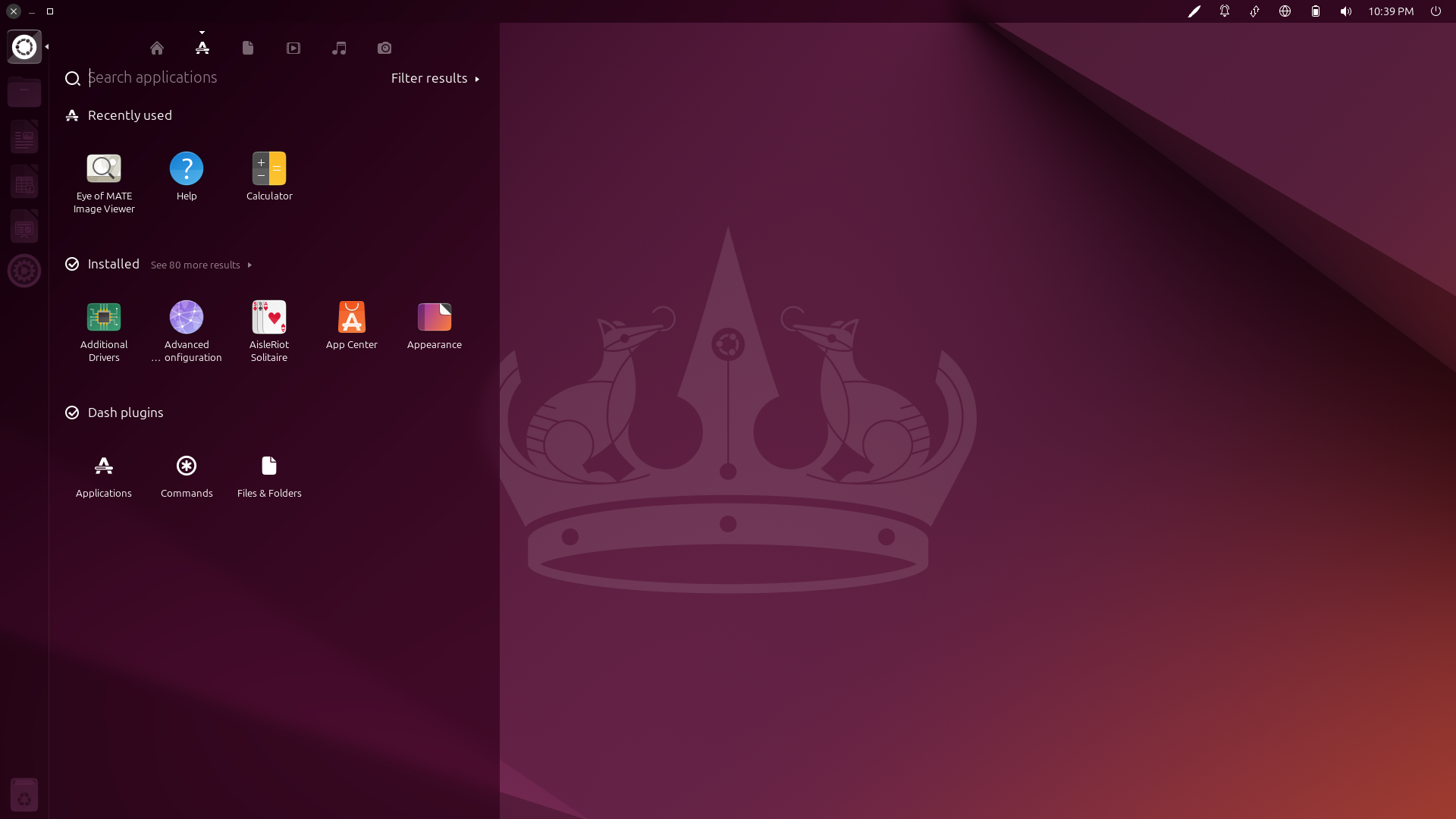
Dash, searching applications in Ubuntu 24.04

Dash is a desktop search utility with preview ability. It enables searching for applications and files. Dash supports search plug-ins, known as Scopes (formerly Lenses). Out of the box, it can query Google Docs, Ubuntu One Music Store, YouTube, Amazon, and social networks (for example, Twitter, Facebook, and Google+). Starting with Ubuntu 13.10, online search queries are sent to a Canonical web service which determines the type of query and directs them to the appropriate third-party web service. Pornographic results are filtered out.

One of the new features of Unity in Ubuntu 12.10 is the shopping lens. As of October 2012, it sent search terms from the user's home lens to Canonical's servers via HTTPS, which would forward them to Amazon which, as part of the search process, sends images of matching products to the lens via HTTP, with Canonical receiving a small commission upon a sale.

Many reviewers criticized it: as the home lens is the natural means to search for content on the local machine, reviewers were concerned about the disclosure of queries that were intended to be local, creating a privacy problem. The feature is active by default (instead of opt-in) and many users could be unaware of it.

On 23 September 2012, Mark Shuttleworth defended the feature. He posted "the Home Lens of the Dash should let you find *anything* anywhere" and that the shopping lens is a step in that direction. He argued that anonymity is preserved because Canonical servers mediate the communication between Unity and Amazon and users could trust Ubuntu. Ubuntu Community Manager Jono Bacon posted "These features are neatly and unobtrusively integrated into the dash, and they not only provide a more useful and comprehensive dash in giving you visibility on this content, but it also generates revenue to help continue to grow and improve Ubuntu." Steven J. Vaughan-Nichols from ZDNet said the feature does not bother him and wrote "If they can make some users happy and some revenue for the company at the same time, that's fine by me." Ted Samson at InfoWorld reported the responses from Shuttleworth and Bacon, but he still criticized the feature.

On 29 October 2012, the Electronic Frontier Foundation criticized the problem. It argued that since product images were (as of October 2012) returned via insecure HTTP then a passive eavesdropper—such as someone on the same wireless network—could get a good idea of the queries. Also, Amazon could correlate the queries with IP addresses. It recommended Ubuntu developers make the feature opt-in and make Ubuntu's privacy settings more fine-grained. It noted that the Dash can be stopped from searching the Internet by switching off "Include online search results" in Ubuntu's privacy settings.

On 7 December 2012, Richard Stallman claimed that Ubuntu contains spyware and should not be used by free software supporters. Jono Bacon rebuked him; he said that Ubuntu responded and implemented many of the requirements the community found important.

Since September 2013, images are anonymized before being sent to the user's computer.

A legal notice in the Dash informs users of the sharing of their data. It states that unless the user has opted out, by turning the searches off, their queries and IP address will be sent to productsearch.ubuntu.com and "selected third parties" for online search results. Ubuntu's Third Party Privacy Policies page informs all of the third parties that may receive users' queries and IP addresses, and states: "For information on how our selected third parties may use your information, please see their privacy policies."

Soon after being introduced, doubts emerged on the conformance of the shopping lens with the European Data Protection Directive. By late 2013, these doubts made the grounds for a formal complaint on the shopping lens filed with the Information Commissioner's Office (ICO), the UK data privacy office. Almost one year later the ICO ruled in favour of Canonical, considering the various improvements introduced to the feature in the meantime to render it conformal with the Data Protection Directive. However, the ruling also made clear that at the time of introduction the feature was not legal, among other things, since it lacked a privacy policy statement.

In March 2014, Michael Hall speaking for Canonical Ltd, indicated that in Unity 8 users will have to opt-in for each search, which will be conducted by opening a special scope and then choosing where to search, addressing previous criticism of its functionality. As of April 2016, with the release of Ubuntu 16.04 LTS, the setting is off by default.

== Unity 2D ==
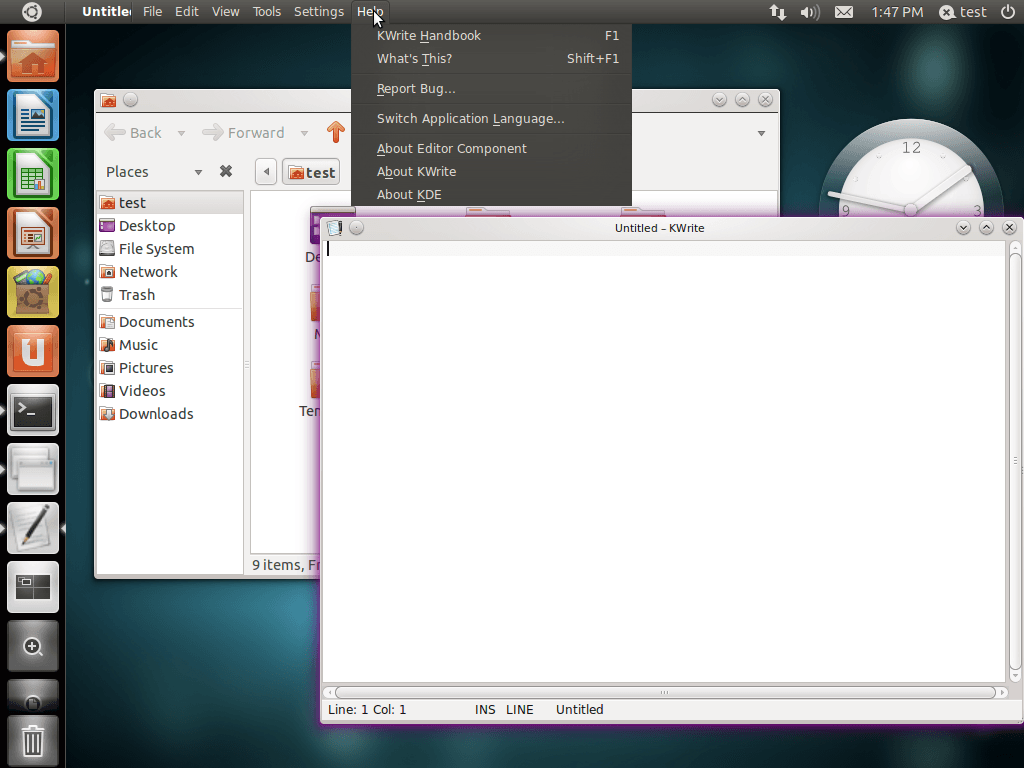
Unity 2D showing the ability to run alongside different window managers and desktop environments

Initially Canonical maintained two discrete versions of Unity, which were visually almost indistinguishable but technically different.

Unity is written as a plugin for Compiz and uses an uncommon OpenGL toolkit called Nux. Being a plugin for Compiz gives Unity GPU-accelerated performance on compatible systems. It is written in the programming languages C++ and Vala.

Unity 2D was a set of individual applications developed for environments that Compiz does not run on, such as when graphics card does not support OpenGL. They were written in the GUI building language QML from the widespread Qt framework. By default Unity 2D used the Metacity window manager but could also use accelerated window managers like Compiz or KWin. In Ubuntu 11.10, Unity 2D used Metacity's XRender-based compositor to achieve transparency effects. Starting with Ubuntu 11.10, Unity 2D replaced the classic GNOME Panel as the fall-back for users whose hardware could not run the Compiz version of Unity.

Unity 2D was discontinued for the release of Ubuntu 12.10 in October 2012, as the 3D version became more capable of running on lower-powered hardware.

== Availability ==
As Unity and the supporting Ayatana projects are developed primarily for Ubuntu and Ubuntu was the first to offer new versions.

Outside of Ubuntu, other Linux distributors have tried to pick up Ayatana, with varying success. The Ayatana components require modification of other applications, which increases the complexity for adoption by others.

- Arch Linux offers many Ayatana components, including Unity and Unity 2D, via an unofficial repository or through AUR.
- Fedora does not offer Unity in its default repositories because Unity requires unsupported patches to GTK. However Unity 6 has been ported to Fedora 17 and can be installed through a branch in the openSUSE repositories where the patches are applied. Newer Fedora and Unity versions are not supported.
- Frugalware had adopted Ayatana, including Unity and Unity 2D, as part of the development branch for an upcoming Frugalware release but the project is no longer maintained.
- openSUSE offers many Ayatana components for GNOME. After the packager abandoned the project because of problems with the then-current version of Compiz, new developers picked up the task and provide packages for openSUSE 12.2 (along with versions for Arch Linux and Fedora 17). Newer openSUSE and Unity versions are not supported.
- Manjaro has a Unity version of its distribution.
- Ubuntu Unity uses the Unity 7 desktop.
- Gentoo has a community-supported overlay to build the Unity7 interface.

== Development ==
Unity was originally unveiled on 10 May 2010 during Ubuntu founder Mark Shuttleworth's keynote at the Ubuntu Developer Summit in Brussels. It was announced as the new interface of both Ubuntu Netbook Edition and a then-planned OEM platform called Ubuntu Light. The new interface was also made available for download during the keynote and visitors of the summit could try it out on a Dell Mini 10v. Shuttleworth cited philosophical differences with the GNOME team over the user experience to explain why Ubuntu would use Unity as the default user interface instead of GNOME Shell, beginning April 2011, with Ubuntu 11.04 (Natty Narwhal). Jono Bacon later explained that Ubuntu will continue to function with the GNOME interface with Unity as a variant of it.

Canonical announced it had engineered Unity for desktop computers as well and would make Unity the default shell for Ubuntu in version 11.04. GNOME Shell was not included in Ubuntu 11.04 Natty Narwhal because work on it was not completed at the time 11.04 was frozen, but was available from a PPA, and was available in Ubuntu 11.10 and later releases, through the official repositories.

In November 2010, Mark Shuttleworth announced the intention to eventually run Unity on Wayland instead of the currently used X Window System, although this plan has since been dropped, replacing Wayland with Mir for Unity 8.

In December 2010, some users requested that the Unity launcher (or dock) be movable from the left to other sides of the screen, but Mark Shuttleworth stated in reply, "I'm afraid that won't work with our broader design goals, so we won't implement that. We want the launcher always close to the Ubuntu button." However, with Ubuntu 11.10, the Ubuntu button was moved into the launcher. A third-party plugin that moved Unity 3D's launcher to the bottom was available. An option to move the launcher to the bottom of the screen was officially implemented in Ubuntu 16.04.

As of 2010, the Unity shell interface developers use a toolkit called Nux instead of Clutter. Unity is a plugin of the Compiz window manager, which Canonical states is faster than Mutter, the window manager for which GNOME Shell is a plugin.

On 14 January 2011, Canonical also released a technical preview of a "2D" version of Unity based on Qt and written in QML. Unity-2D was not shipped on the Ubuntu 11.04 CD, instead the classic GNOME desktop was the fall-back for hardware that could not run Unity.

In March 2011, public indications emerged of friction between Canonical (and its development of Unity) and the GNOME developers. As part of Unity development Ubuntu developers had submitted API coding for inclusion in Gnome as an external dependency. According to Dave Neary, "... an external dependency is a non-GNOME module which is a dependency of a package contained in one of the GNOME module sets," and the reasons why libappindicator was not accepted as an external dependency are that "... it does not fit that definition," it has "... duplicate functionality with libnotify," (the current Gnome Shell default) and its CLA does not meet current GNOME policy. Mark Shuttleworth responded,

This is a critical juncture for the leadership of Gnome. I'll state plainly that I feel the long tail of good-hearted contributors to Gnome and Gnome applications are being let down by a decision-making process that has let competitive dynamics diminish the scope of Gnome itself. Ideas that are not generated 'at the core' have to fight incredibly and unnecessarily hard to get oxygen... getting room for ideas to be explored should not feel like a frontal assault on a machine gun post. This is no way to lead a project. This is a recipe for a project that loses great people to environments that are more open to different ways of seeing the world ... Embracing those other ideas and allowing them to compete happily and healthily is the only way to keep the innovation they bring inside your brand. Otherwise, you're doomed to watching them innovate and then having to "relayout" your own efforts to keep up, badmouthing them in the process. We started this with a strong, clear statement: Unity is a shell for Gnome. Now Gnome leadership have to decide if they want the fruit of that competition to be an asset to Gnome, or not.

== Release ==
In April 2011, Mark Shuttleworth announced that Ubuntu 11.10 Oneiric Ocelot would not include the classic GNOME desktop as a fall-back to Unity, unlike Ubuntu 11.04 Natty Narwhal. Instead Ubuntu 11.10 used the Qt-based Unity 2D for users whose hardware cannot support the 3D version. However, the classic GNOME desktop (GNOME Panel) can be installed separately in Ubuntu 11.10 and later versions through gnome-panel, a package in the Ubuntu repositories.

At the November 2011 Ubuntu Developer Summit, it was announced that Unity for Ubuntu 12.04 would not re-enable the systray, and would have better application integration, and the ability to drag lenses onto the launcher, and that the 2D version of Unity would use the same decoration buttons as the 3D version.

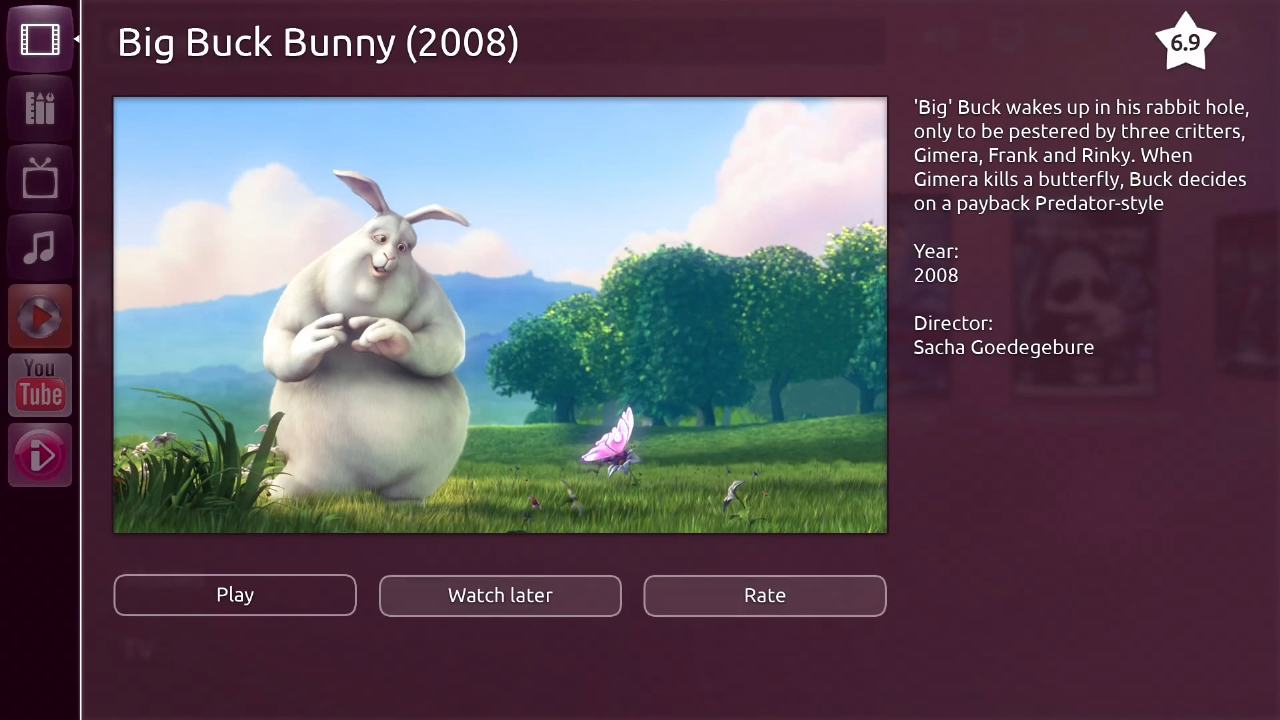
Ubuntu TV showing Big Buck Bunny

A variant of Unity was planned to run on Ubuntu TV, an ultimately unreleased smart TV operating system demonstrated at the 2012 Consumer Electronics Show.

In July 2012, at OSCON, Shuttleworth explained some of the historical reasoning behind Unity's development. The initial decision to develop a new interface in 2008 was driven by a desire to innovate and to pass Microsoft and Apple in user experience with user interface that could be used across many device form factors, including desktops, laptops, tablets, smartphones and TVs. Shuttleworth said "The old desktop would force your tablet or your phone into all kinds of crazy of funny postures. So we said: Screw it. We’re going to move the desktop to where it needs to be for the future. [This] turned out to be a deeply unpopular process." Windows 8's Metro interface became an additional incentive for Unity development due to perceived inconsistency in the operating system's user experience.

== Later releases and Unity 8 ==
In March 2013 the plan to use the Mir display server was announced for future development of Unity, in place of the previously announced Wayland/Weston.

In April 2015 it was announced that Unity 8 would ship as part of Ubuntu 16.04 LTS, or possibly later. It was also noted that this version of Unity would not visually differ much from Unity 7.

In April 2016 Ubuntu 16.04 was released with Unity 7, not Unity 8, as the default user interface, though Unity 8 could be installed through the Ubuntu software repositories as an optional, preview package. During an Ubuntu Online Summit, Canonical employees said that their goal was to ship Unity 8 as the default interface for Ubuntu 16.10, to be released in October 2016. These plans fell through, and Unity 7 stayed as the main interface until Ubuntu 17.10 in 2017.

== Discontinuation by Canonical and forks ==
On 5 April 2017, Mark Shuttleworth announced that Canonical's work on Unity would end. Ubuntu 18.04 LTS, a year away from release at the time, would abandon the Unity desktop and employ the GNOME 3 desktop instead. Development of Unity 7 was taken over by the Unity7 Maintainers team, and they released version 7.6 on 30 June 2022 as the first new version in 6 years. Development of Unity8 continued separately under UBports as part of Ubuntu Touch – this fork was renamed to Lomiri in February 2020.

In May 2020, Ubuntu Unity, a new unofficial Ubuntu version was first released, using the Unity7 desktop as its default environment. It became an official Ubuntu flavor starting with version 22.10 and includes early support for Lomiri starting with version 24.04.

== Reception ==
Early versions of Unity received mixed reviews and generated controversy. Some reviewers found fault with the implementation and limitations, while other reviewers found Unity an improvement over GNOME 2 with the further potential to improve over time. Reception later improved upon the release of Ubuntu 12.10, with Jack Wallen of TechRepublic describing it as an "incredible advancement" and Jesse Smith describing it as "attractive" and saying that it had grown to maturity. Ryan Paul of Ars Technica said Unity was responsive, robust and had the reliability expected from a mature desktop shell, though the Dash feature of Unity in Ubuntu 12.10 generated a privacy controversy.

=== Pre-release ===
==== Ubuntu 10.10 ====
In reviewing an alpha version of Unity, shortly after it was unveiled in the summer of 2010, Ryan Paul of Ars Technica noted problems figuring out how to launch additional applications that were not on the dock bar. He also mentioned a number of bugs, including the inability to track which applications were open and other window management difficulties. He remarked that many of these were probably due to the early stage in the development process and expected them to be resolved with time. Paul concluded positively, "Our test of the Unity prototype leads us to believe that the project has considerable potential and could bring a lot of value to the Ubuntu Netbook Edition. Its unique visual style melds beautifully with Ubuntu's new default theme and its underlying interaction model seems compelling and well-suited for small screens." In an extensive review of Ubuntu 10.10 shortly after its release in October 2010, Paul made further observations on Unity, noting that "Unity is highly ambitious and offers a substantially different computing experience than the conventional Ubuntu desktop." He concluded that "The [application] selectors are visually appealing, but they are easily the weakest part of the Unity user experience. The poor performance significantly detracts from their value in day-to-day use and the lack of actual file management functionality largely renders the file selector useless. The underlying concepts behind their design are good, however, and they have the potential to be much more valuable in the future as unity matures."

==== Ubuntu 11.04 ====
In March 2011, writer Benjamin Humphrey of OMG Ubuntu criticized the development version of Unity then being tested for Ubuntu 11.04 on a number of grounds, including a development process that is divorced from user experiences, the lack of response to user feedback, "the seemingly unbelievable lack of communication the design team has," and a user interface he described as "cluttered and inconsistent". Overall, however, he concluded that "Unity is not all bad... While a number of the concepts in Unity may be flawed from a design point of view, the actual idea itself is not, and Canonical deserve applause for trying to jump start the stagnant open source desktop with Unity when the alternatives do not evoke confidence."

On 14 April 2011, Ryan Paul reviewed a pre-release build of Unity, praising its "close attention to detail" and citing the top menu bar and launcher as particular highlights. He criticized the process of finding applications not present on the launcher, along with the "distracting and largely superfluous" presentation of available uninstalled applications, concluding that Unity was potentially better than GNOME for regular usage while calling some of the changes "disorienting". On release, he further criticized the lack of customization options. In a more thorough review of Ubuntu 11.04, Paul commended Unity as a positive development for Ubuntu, but that more resources had to be invested to improve outstanding issues.

On 25 April 2011, the eve of the release of Ubuntu 11.04, reviewer Matt Hartley of IT Management criticized Unity, saying that the "dumbing down of the Linux desktop environment is bordering on insane".

=== Release ===
==== Ubuntu 11.04 ====
Reviewer Joey Sneddon of OMG Ubuntu was more positive about Unity in his review of Ubuntu 11.04, encouraging users, "Sure it's different—but different doesn't mean bad; the best thing to do is to give it a chance." He concluded that Unity on the desktop makes "better use of screen space, intuitive interface layouts and, most importantly, making a desktop that works for the user and not in spite of them."

Following the release of Ubuntu 11.04 Canonical Ltd. founder Mark Shuttleworth indicated that, while he was generally happy with the implementation of Unity, he felt that there was room for improvement and that he "would not be satisfied unless we fixed many of [the early issues] in 11.10", further stating that Unity was "the best option for the average user" and that Ubuntu "had to choose a default position."

Jesse Smith of DistroWatch criticized its lack of customization, menu handling and Unity hardware requirements, saying, "There's really nothing here which should demand 3D acceleration." He also noted that "The layout doesn't translate well to large screens or multiple-screen systems." Jack M. Germain of Linux Insider indicated strong dislike for it, saying, "Put me in the Hate It category" and indicating that as development has proceeded he likes it less and less.

==== Ubuntu 11.10 ====
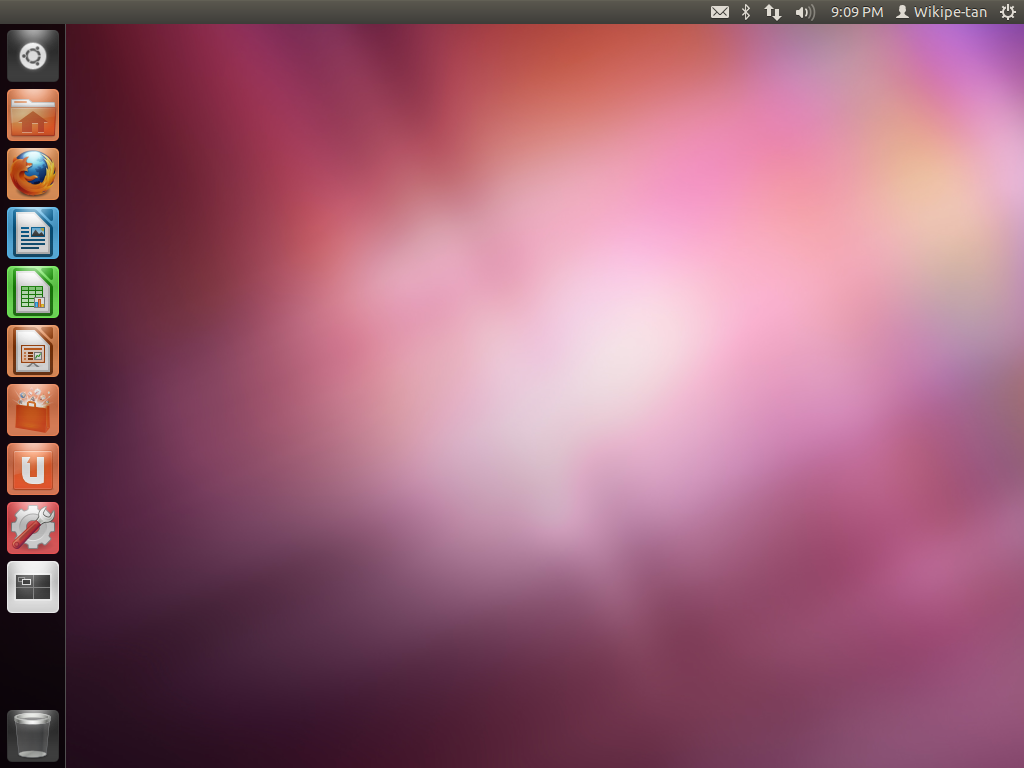
Unity desktop in Ubuntu 11.10

More criticism appeared after the release of Ubuntu 11.10. In November 2011 Robert Storey writing in DistroWatch criticized Unity for taking up developer time to the point that Ubuntu's stability was negatively affected, calling it "kind of cute, but nothing to write home about."

Developers of Ubuntu-based Linux distributions were interviewed about Unity by Datamation in a 2011 article, with the lead developers of Super OS and Tuquito intending to use the interface. Fully-free software distributions gNewSense and Trisquel omitted Unity as it mandated 3D graphics acceleration, and the ArtistX, Vinux and UberStudent projects declining to use it due to accessibility and usability concerns.

=== Later assessments ===
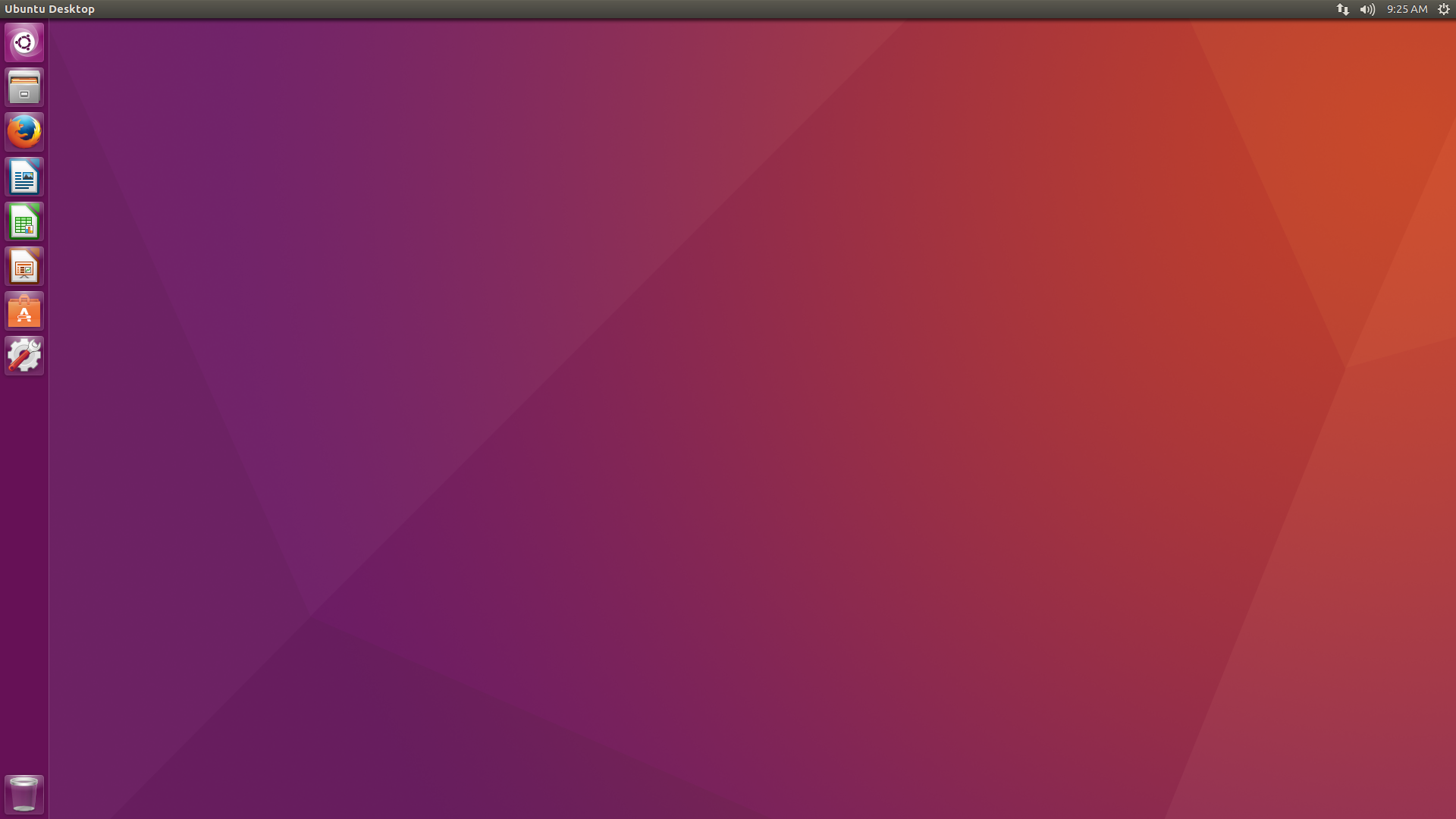
Unity desktop in Ubuntu 16.04 LTS

Reviewing Ubuntu 12.04, Jesse Smith of DistroWatch wrote that previously "underwhelming" parts of Unity had "come together to form a whole, clear picture", highlighting the HUD as easy to use for novice users and versatile for power users, though citing inflexibility of Unity as a whole as an issue. Jack Wallen of TechRepublic, who had been critical of earlier versions of Unity, wrote that he was "working much more efficiently" with the environment and called it an "incredible" advancement. Ryan Paul praised Unity's responsiveness, robustness and reliability, highlighting the HUD as a feature which contributed to making it "even better in Ubuntu 12.04", while criticizing aspects of the user experience as "detract[ing] from [its] predictability and ease of use."

Jack Wallen of TechRepublic, in reviewing the changes scheduled for Unity in Ubuntu 16.04 LTS, concluded, "Ubuntu Unity is not the desktop pariah you once thought it was. This desktop environment has evolved into a beautiful, efficient interface that does not deserve the scorn and derision heaped upon it by so many."

== See also ==
- Comparison of X Window System desktop environments
- Comparison of X window managers
- Ubuntu Unity
- Lomiri, a continuation of Unity 8
