= Lomiri =

Graphical user interface for Ubuntu Touch

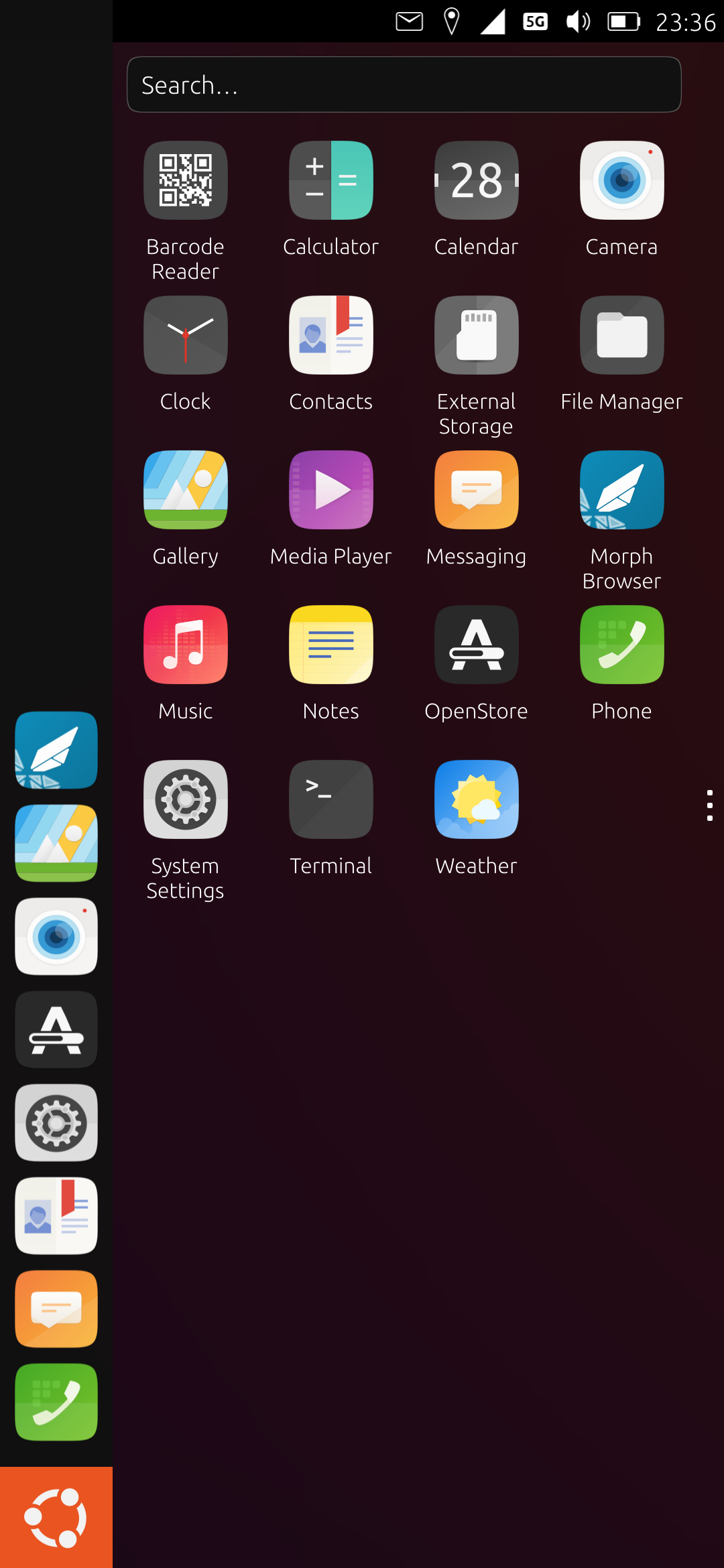
- Screenshot of a pre-release version of Ubuntu Touch, using the Lomiri interface
- Original author: Canonical
- Developer: UBports
- Release: 30 July 2014; 12 years ago (as Unity 8)
- Stable release: 0.5.0 / 5 May 2025; 18 months ago
- Preview release: 0.5.0 / 5 May 2025; 18 months ago
- Written in: C++ and QML
- Operating system: Linux
- Type: Graphical user interface
- License: GPL v3, LGPL v3
- Website: lomiri.com
- Repository: gitlab.com/ubports/development/core/lomiri

Lomiri (formerly Unity 8) is a graphical user interface based on the Qt framework, originally developed by Canonical for Ubuntu as a successor to the Unity shell. In 2017, development was discontinued by Canonical and it has since been maintained by UBports as part of Ubuntu Touch and ported to other Linux distributions.

== History ==
Development of Unity 8 started in 2013 and the first preview build was published on 30 July 2014. It was intended to be introduced as a primary user interface in Ubuntu 16.04 LTS, but it was ultimately an optional downloadable package as it was not yet ready for production use. Canonical later announced that the following short-term release of Ubuntu would use Unity 8 as the main interface but Unity 7 continued in this role while the later version remained as a preview.

On 5 April 2017, Mark Shuttleworth announced that Canonical's work on Unity and the associated Ubuntu Touch mobile operating system would end and that the following LTS release of Ubuntu would use the GNOME 3 desktop instead. The UBports project subsequently continued development of Unity 8 along with Ubuntu Touch.

On 27 February 2020, UBports announced that Unity 8 would be renamed to Lomiri to prevent confusion with the Unity game engine and the separately-maintained fork of Unity 7. It has been ported to other Linux distributions including Debian, Arch Linux, Manjaro, and Nura. In April 2024, Ubuntu Unity, an official Ubuntu version using the Unity 7 fork, introduced early support for Lomiri with version 24.04.

== Design ==
Users can access the whole system by swiping from the edges of the screen. A short swipe from the left edge allows for instant access to applications pinned to the launcher, while swiping all the way across reveals the home scope, which can be set by the user. This menu is available from the home screen and any running app.

Other running applications are accessed by swiping the finger from the right edge of the screen to the left, which switches to the previous application (short swipe) or shows all open apps (long swipe). Swiping up from the bottom is used to show or hide tools specific to the app being used.

== Education ==
Lomiri and the UBports community is backed by OS-SCi with the training and guidance of new Lomiri volunteers. Since March 2026, OS-SCi has published two books on Lomiri: Lomiri app development level 1 and Lomiri app development level 2.
