= Responsiveness =

Measure in human-computer interaction

Responsiveness requires a low latency/delay of the entire input-output-loop.

Responsiveness as a concept of computer science refers to the specific ability of a system or functional unit to complete assigned tasks within a given time.

In the Reactive principle, Responsiveness is one of the fundamental criteria along with resilience, elasticity and message driven.

It is one of the criteria under the principle of robustness. The other three are observability, recoverability, and task conformance.

== Vs performance ==
Software which lacks a decent process management can have poor responsiveness even on a fast machine. On the other hand, even slow hardware can run responsive software.

It is much more important that a system actually spend the available resources in the best way possible. For instance, it makes sense to let the mouse driver run at a very high priority to provide fluid mouse interactions. For long-term operations, such as copying, downloading or transforming big files the most important factor is to provide good user-feedback and not the performance of the operation since it can quite well run in the background, using only spare processor time.

== Delays ==
Long delays can be a major cause of user frustration, or can lead the user to believe the system is not functioning, or that a command or input gesture has been ignored. Responsiveness is therefore considered an essential usability issue for human-computer-interaction (HCI). The rationale behind the responsiveness principle is that the system should deliver results of an operation to users in a timely and organized manner.

The frustration threshold can be quite different, depending on the situation and the fact that the user interface depends on local or remote systems to show a visible response.

There are at least three user tolerance thresholds (i.e.):

0.1 seconds
under 0.1 seconds the response is perceived as instantaneous (high user satisfaction);
1.0 seconds
between 0.1 seconds and 1.0 second a slight delay is perceived, which is regarded as annoying in a local system but tolerated in a web interface that depends on a remote system for the response; this kind of delay usually does not interrupt user's flow of thoughts;
10 seconds
between 1 second and 10 seconds, user's flow of thoughts is interrupted (user productivity is severely impacted) but user is able to keep his/her attention focused on the task being performed;
over 10 seconds of wait is regarded as unacceptable, as it usually interrupts the user's attention on the task being performed.

== Solutions to improve responsiveness ==
Although numerous other options may exist, the most frequently used and recommended answers to responsiveness issues are:

- Optimizing the process that delivers the output by eliminating wasteful, unproductive output from the algorithm or method by which the result is produced.
- A decent process management system, giving the highest priority to operations that would otherwise interrupt the user's work flow, such as typing, onscreen buttons, or moving the mouse pointer. Usually there is enough "idle time" in between, for the other operations.
- Using idle time to prepare for the operations a user might do next.
- Let the user do something productive while the system is busy, for instance, writing information in a form, reading a manual, etc. For instance, in a tabbed browser, the user can read one page while loading another.
- Deliver intermediate results, before the operation is finished. For instance, a web page can already be operated before all images are loaded, which will take up the idle time which would otherwise be spent needlessly.
- If some waiting is inevitable, a progress indicator can significantly reduce frustration. For short delays, an animated icon might be sufficient. Longer delays are better covered with a progress bar, or, if possible, the system should provide an approximation of the time that an operation is going to take before starting it.

== See also ==
- Reliability, availability and serviceability
- Elasticity (cloud computing)
- Network resilience
- Agile construction
- Reactive user interface
- Responsive web design
