= Start screen =

Start screen may refer to:

- Home screen
- Boot screen, a screen shown at the start of an operating system
- Loading screen, a screen shown at the start of a level or mission in a video game
- Splash screen, a screen shown at the start of a computer program
- Start screen (Windows), in Windows 8.x and Windows Server 2012
- Title screen, a screen shown at the start of video game
