= Hourglass =

Device to measure the passage of time

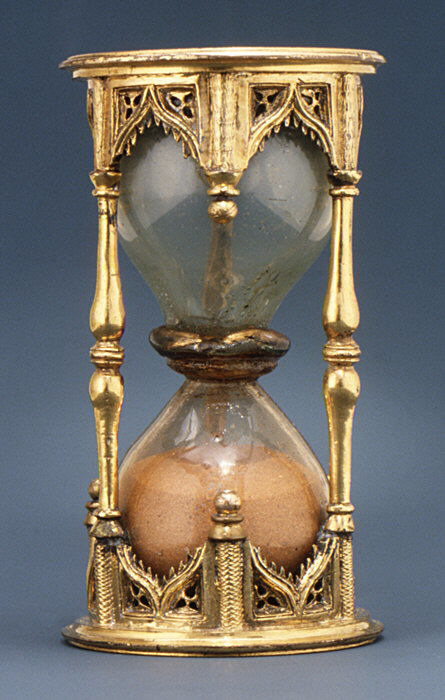
German half-hour sand glass, first quarter of the 16th century, bronze-gilt and silver-gilt, height: 8.3 cm, diameter: 8.4 cm, Metropolitan of Art (New York City)

An hourglass (or sandglass, sand timer, or sand clock) is a device used to measure the passage of time. It comprises two glass bulbs connected vertically by a narrow neck that allows a regulated flow of a substance (historically sand) from the upper bulb to the lower one due to gravity. Typically, the upper and lower bulbs are symmetric. The specific duration of time a given hourglass measures is determined by factors including the quantity and coarseness of the particulate matter and the neck width.

Depictions of an hourglass as a symbol of the passage of time are found in art, especially on tombstones or other monuments, from antiquity to the present day. The form of a winged hourglass has been used as a literal depiction of the Latin phrase tempus fugit ("time flies").

== History ==
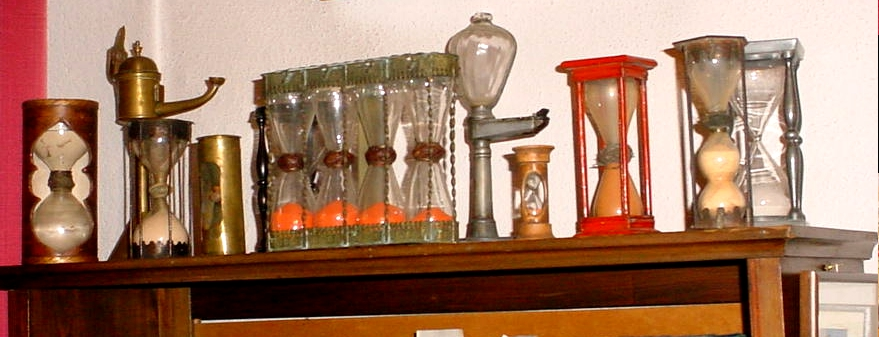
Antique sandglasses

=== Antiquity ===
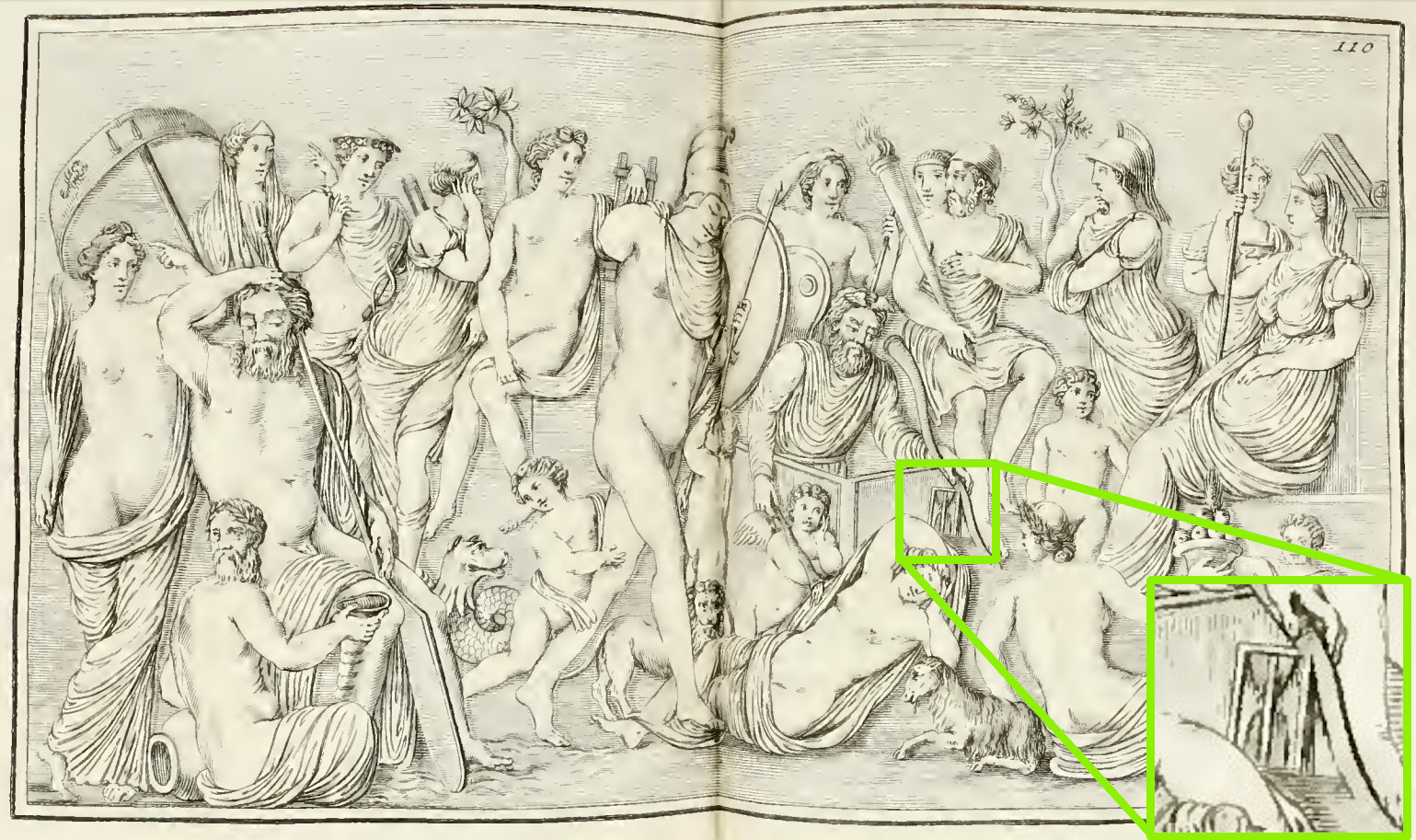
Sarcophagus dated c. 350, representing the wedding of Peleus and Thetis (with magnification of an hourglass held by Morpheus)

The origin of the hourglass is unclear. Its predecessor the clepsydra, or water clock, is known to have existed in Babylon and Egypt as early as the 16th century BCE.

=== Middle Ages ===
There are no records of the hourglass existing in Europe prior to the Late Middle Ages; the first documented example dates from the 14th century, a depiction in the 1338 fresco Allegory of Good Government by Ambrogio Lorenzetti.

Use of the marine sandglass has been recorded since the 14th century in logbooks of European ships. In the same period it appears in other records and lists of ships stores. The earliest recorded reference that can be said with certainty to refer to a marine sandglass dates from c. 1345, in a receipt of Thomas de Stetesham, clerk of the King's ship La George, in the reign of Edward III of England; translated from the Latin, the receipt says: in 1345:

The same Thomas accounts to have paid at Lescluse, in Flanders, for twelve glass horologes (" pro xii. orlogiis vitreis "), price of each 4 1/2 gross', in sterling 9s. Item, For four horologes of the same sort (" de eadem secta "), bought there, price of each five gross', making in sterling 3s. 4d.

Marine sandglasses were popular aboard ships, as they were the most dependable measurement of time while at sea. Unlike the clepsydra, hourglasses using granular materials were not affected by the motion of a ship and less affected by temperature changes (which could cause condensation inside a clepsydra). While hourglasses were insufficiently accurate to be compared against solar noon for the determination of a ship's longitude (as an error of just four minutes would correspond to one degree of longitude), they were sufficiently accurate to be used in conjunction with a chip log to enable the measurement of a ship's speed in knots.

The hourglass also found popularity on land as an inexpensive alternative to mechanical clocks. Hourglasses were commonly seen in use in churches, homes, and work places to measure sermons, cooking time, and time spent on breaks from labor. Because they were being used for more everyday tasks, the model of the hourglass began to shrink. The smaller models were more practical and very popular as they made timing more discreet.

After 1500, the hourglass was not as widespread as it had been. This was due to the development of the mechanical clock, which became more accurate, smaller and cheaper, and made keeping time easier. The hourglass, however, did not disappear entirely. Although they became relatively less useful as clock technology advanced, hourglasses remained desirable in their design. The oldest known surviving hourglass resides in the British Museum in London.

Not until the 18th century did John Harrison invent a marine chronometer that significantly improved on the stability of the hourglass at sea. Taking elements from the design logic behind the hourglass, he made a marine chronometer in 1761 that was able to accurately measure the journey from England to Jamaica accurate within five seconds.

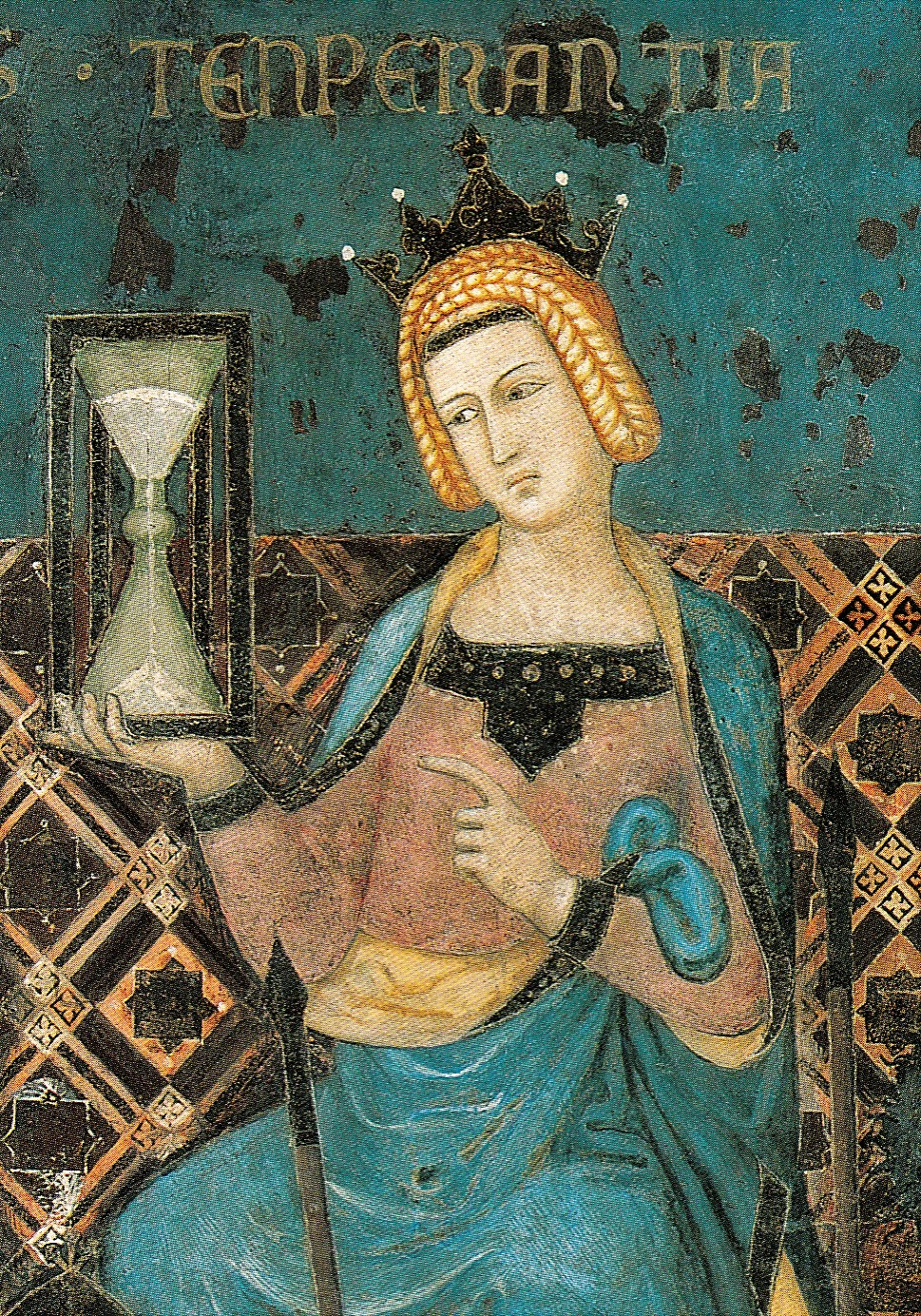
Temperance bearing an hourglass; detail Lorenzetti's Allegory of Good Government, 1338

== Design ==
Little written evidence exists to explain why its external form is the shape that it is. The glass bulbs used, however, have changed in style and design over time. While the main designs have always been ampoule in shape, the bulbs were not always connected. The first hourglasses were two separate bulbs with a cord wrapped at their union that was then coated in wax to hold the piece together and let sand flow in between. It was not until 1760 that both bulbs were blown together to keep moisture out of the bulbs and regulate the pressure within the bulb that varied the flow.

== Material ==
While some early hourglasses actually did use silica sand as the granular material to measure time, many did not use sand at all. The material used in most bulbs was "powdered marble, tin/lead oxides, [or] pulverized, burnt eggshell". Over time, different textures of granule matter were tested to see which gave the most constant flow within the bulbs. It was later discovered that for the perfect flow to be achieved the ratio of granule bead to the width of the bulb neck needed to be 1/12 or more but not greater than 1/2 the neck of the bulb.

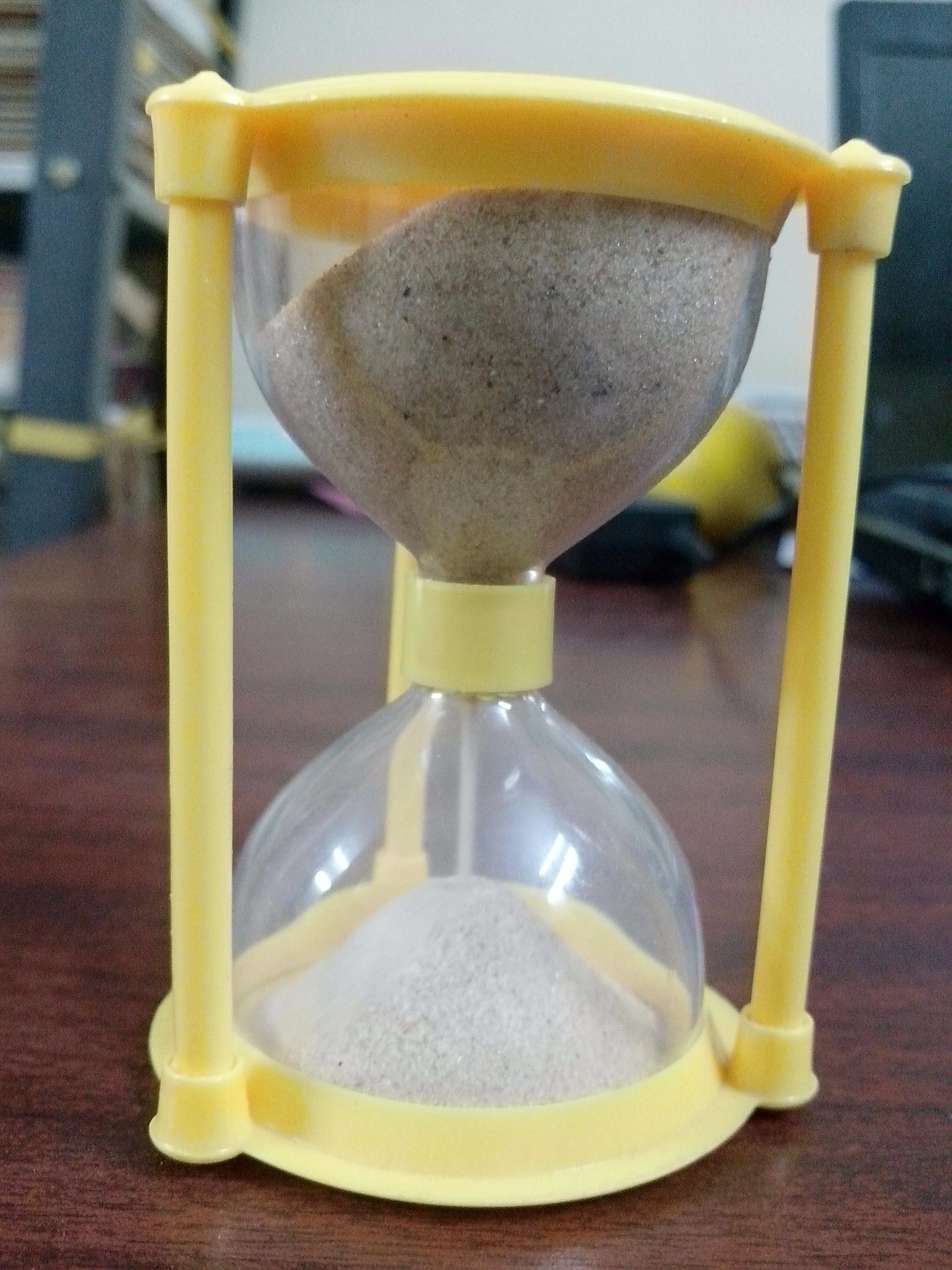
An hourglass

== Practical uses ==
Hourglasses were an early dependable and accurate measure of time. The rate of flow of the sand is independent of the depth in the upper reservoir, and the instrument will not freeze in cold weather. From the 15th century onwards, hourglasses were being used in a range of applications at sea, in the church, in industry, and in cookery.

During the voyage of Ferdinand Magellan around the globe, 18 hourglasses from Barcelona were in the ship's inventory, after the trip had been authorized by King Charles I of Spain. It was the job of a ship's page to turn the hourglasses and thus provide the times for the ship's log. Noon was the reference time for navigation, which did not depend on the glass, as the sun would be at its zenith. A number of sandglasses could be fixed in a common frame, each with a different operating time, e.g. as in a four-way Italian sandglass likely from the 17th century, in the collections of the Science Museum, in South Kensington, London, which could measure intervals of quarter, half, three-quarters, and one hour (and which were used in churches, for priests and ministers to measure lengths of sermons).

=== Modern practical uses ===
While hourglasses are no longer widely used for keeping time, some institutions do maintain them. Both houses of the Australian Parliament use three hourglasses to time certain procedures, such as divisions.

Sand timers are sometimes included with tabletop games such as Pictionary and Boggle that place time constraints on rounds of play.

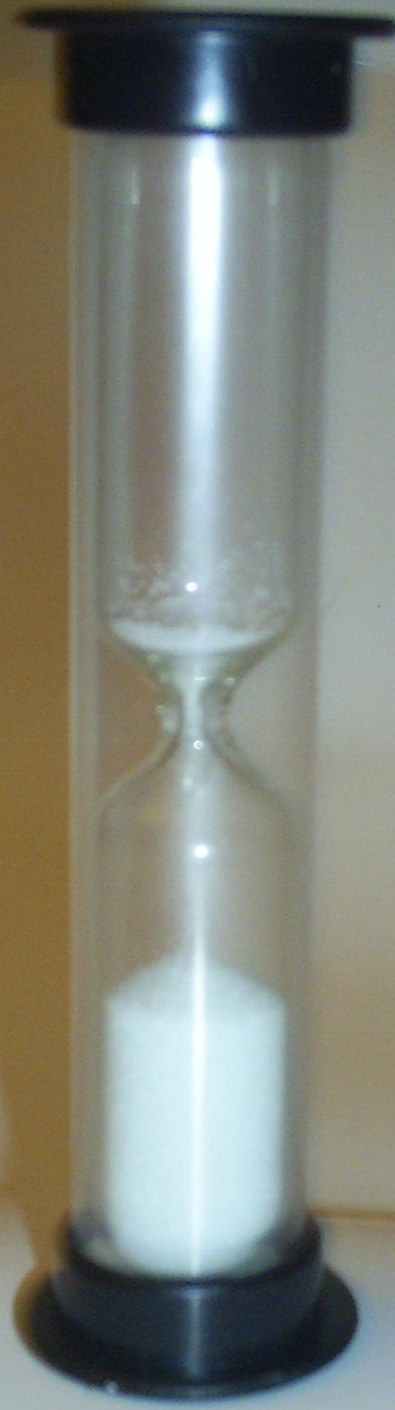
A contemporary sand timer

An hourglass in use, 2015

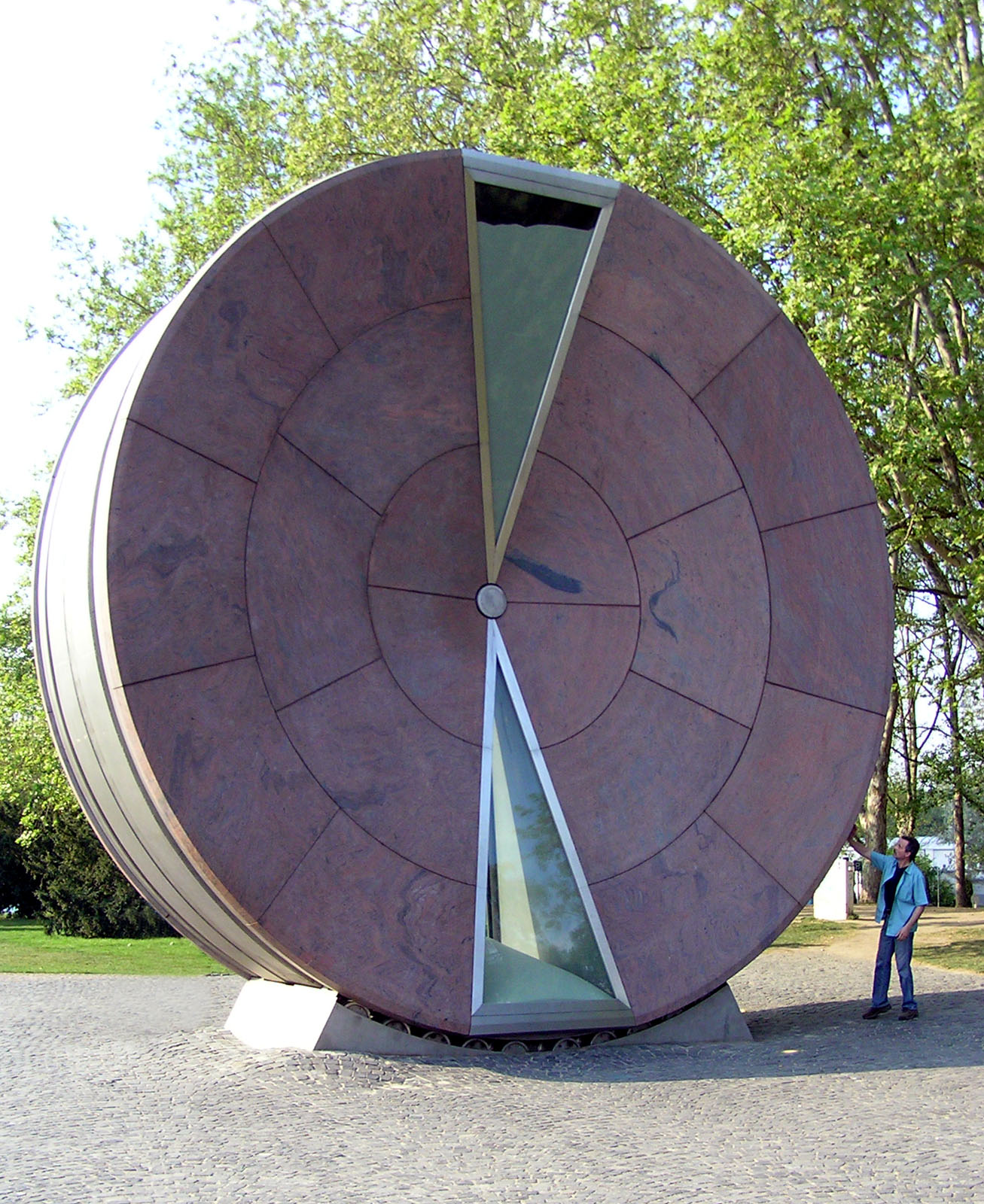
The Timewheel in Budapest, Hungary

== Symbolic uses ==
Flag erroneously attributed to pirate Christopher Moody

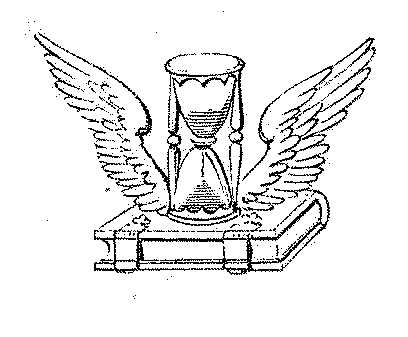
A winged hourglass as a literal depiction of the Latin phrase tempus fugit ("time flies")

Unlike most other methods of measuring time, the hourglass concretely represents the present as being between the past and the future, and this has made it an enduring symbol of time as a concept.

The hourglass, sometimes with the addition of metaphorical wings, is often used as a symbol that human existence is fleeting, and that the "sands of time" will run out for every human life. It was used thus on pirate flags, to evoke fear through imagery associated with death. In England, hourglasses were sometimes placed in coffins, and they have graced gravestones for centuries. The hourglass was also used in alchemy as a symbol for hour.

The former Metropolitan Borough of Greenwich in London used an hourglass on its coat of arms, symbolising Greenwich's role as the origin of Greenwich Mean Time (GMT). The district's successor, the Royal Borough of Greenwich, uses two hourglasses on its coat of arms.

=== Modern symbolic uses ===
Hourglass cursor

Recognition of the hourglass as a symbol of time has survived its obsolescence as a timekeeper. For example, the American television soap opera Days of Our Lives (1965–present) displays an hourglass in its opening credits, with narration by Macdonald Carey: "Like sands through the hourglass, so are the days of our lives."

Various computer graphical user interfaces may change the pointer to an hourglass while the program is in the middle of a task, and may not accept user input. During that period of time, other programs, such as those open in other windows, may work normally. When such an hourglass does not disappear, it suggests a program is in an infinite loop and needs to be terminated, or is waiting for some external event (such as the user inserting a CD).

Unicode has an HOURGLASS symbol at U+231B (⌛).

In the 21st century, the Extinction symbol came into use as a symbol of the Holocene extinction and climate crisis. The symbol features an hourglass to represent time "running out" for extinct and endangered species, and also to represent time "running out" for climate change mitigation.

== Hourglass motif ==
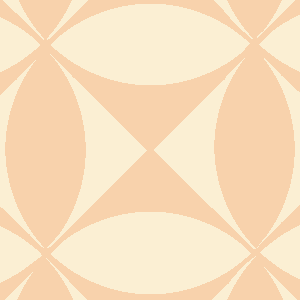
Diagram of "hourglass" motif from carved stone tablet, Solomon Islands

Because of its symmetry, graphic signs resembling an hourglass are seen in the art of cultures which never encountered such objects. Vertical pairs of triangles joined at the apex are common in Native American art; both in North America, where it can represent, for example, the body of the Thunderbird or (in more elongated form) an enemy scalp, and in South America, where it is believed to represent a Chuncho jungle dweller. In Zulu textiles they symbolise a married man, as opposed to a pair of triangles joined at the base, which symbolise a married woman. Neolithic examples can be seen among Spanish cave paintings. Observers have even given the name "hourglass motif" to shapes which have more complex symmetry, such as a repeating circle and cross pattern from the Solomon Islands. Both the members of Project Tic Toc from the television series The Time Tunnel and the Challengers of the Unknown use symbols of the hourglass, representing either time travel or time running out.

Hourglasses in art

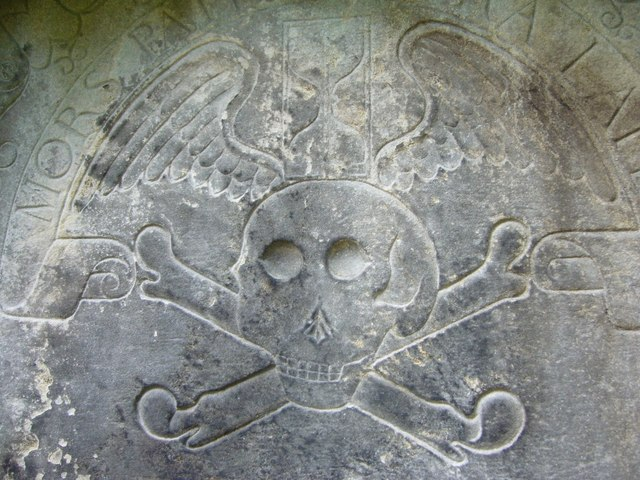
17th-century tombstone in the mausoleum of John Livingstone, "an apothecary in Edinburgh", who fell victim to the 1645 plague

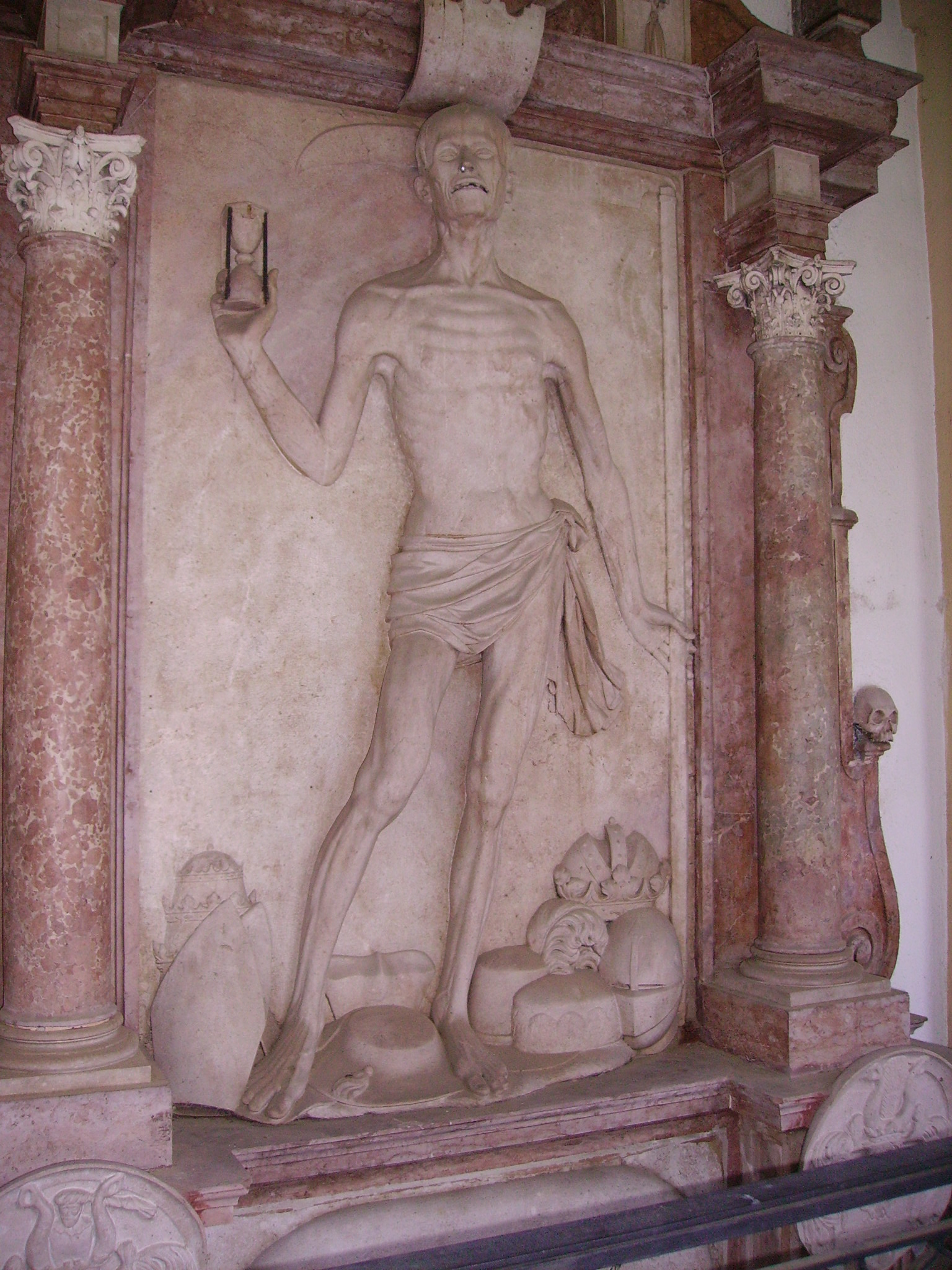
Tomb in the Sebastiansfriedhof, Salzburg

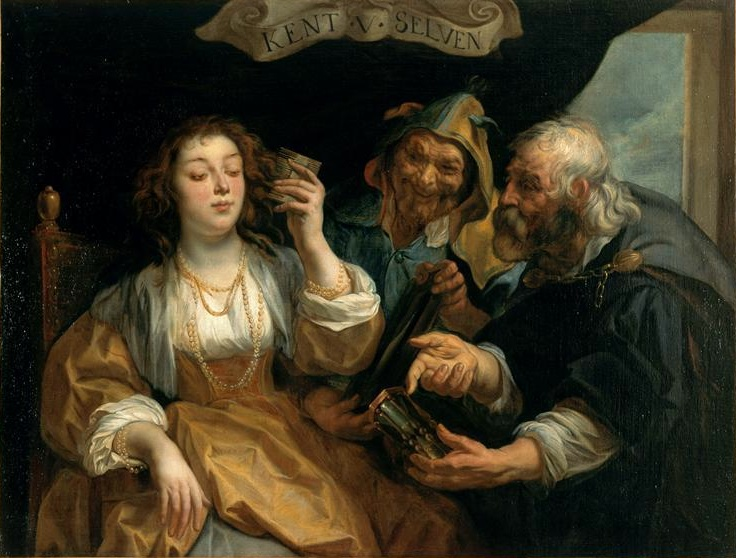
Know thyself – Youth between Vice and Virtue (attributed to Jacob Jordaens)

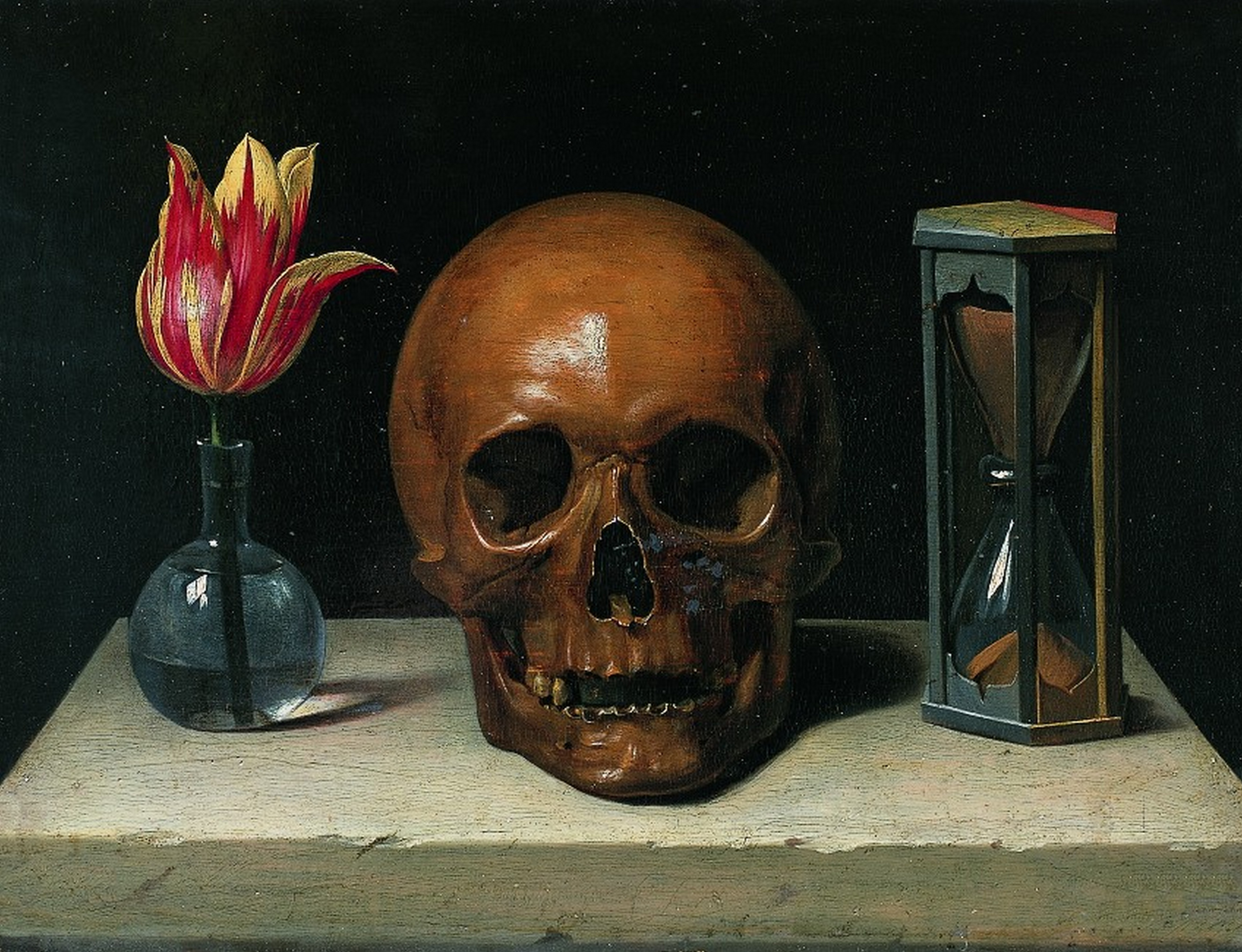
Philippe de Champaigne Still-Life with a Skull, vanitas painting, 1671

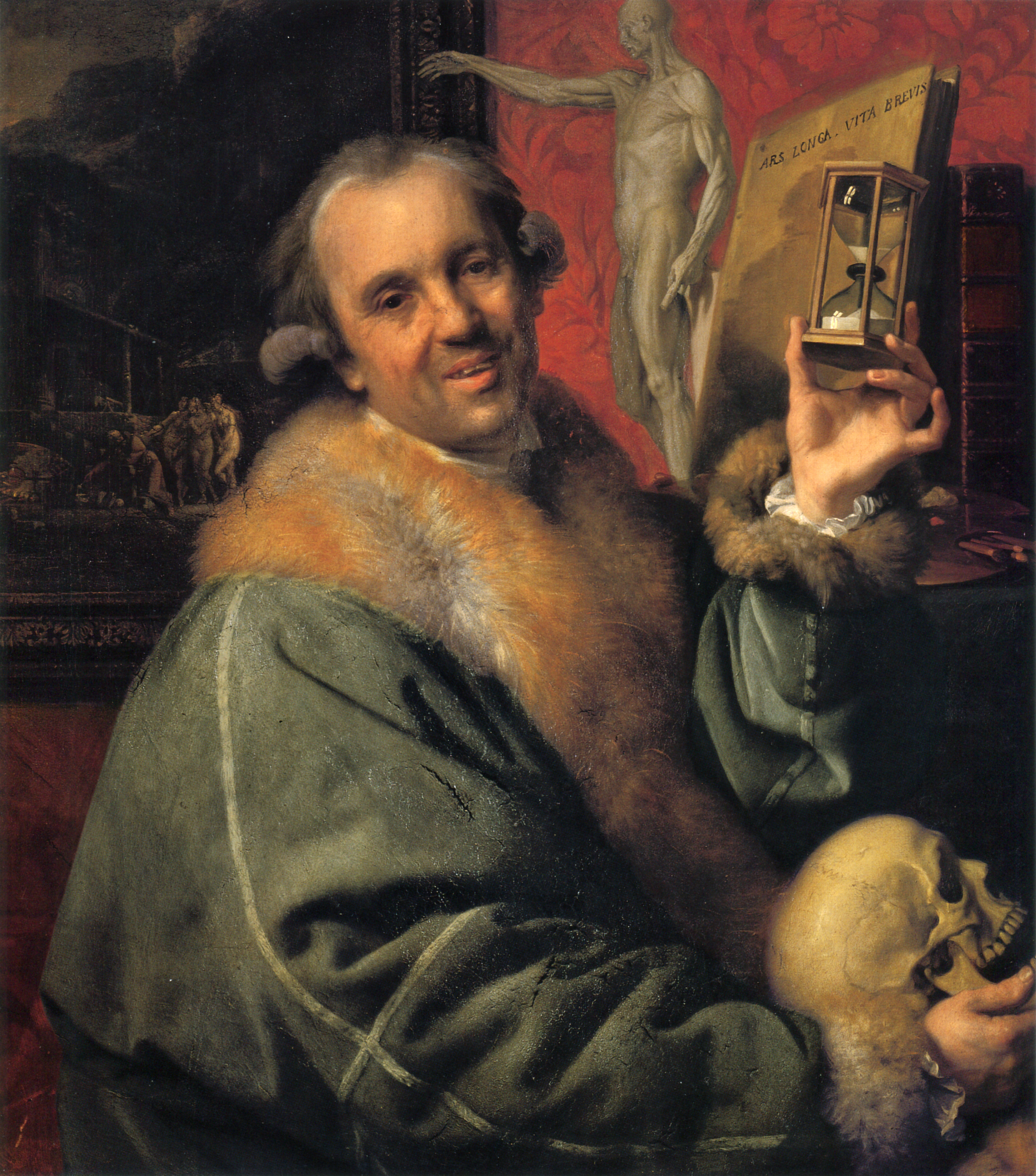
Self-portrait (with hourglass and skull) by Johann Zoffany, c. 1776

== See also ==
- Chemex Coffeemaker
- Hourglass figure
- List of largest hourglasses
- Marine sandglass
- Water clock
