= Progress indicator =

User interface element

A progress indicator is an element of a command-line interface, a textual user interface, or a graphical user interface that is intended to inform the user that an operation is in progress, to reassure that the system is not hung or waiting for user input, and often to provide the user with an estimate of how far through a task the system has progressed.

== Examples of progress indicators ==
- A progress bar, a typically horizontal bar which is gradually filled with a color as the process completes.
- A throbber, an image in a program's interface which animates to show that the software is busy.
- A splash screen, covering all or most of the computer screen while a program is loading.
- Turning the mouse pointer into an hourglass or a spinning pinwheel to indicate to the user that they should not click anything until the active process is complete.
- A simple textual percentage figure, common in CLI applications.
- A growing row of dots indicating the progress in loading a file (as done in some boot sectors and text-mode operating systems) i.e. "Loading......".
