= SWOD (disambiguation) =

SWOD may refer to:

- The spinning wheel of death, a name for the wait cursor in Apple's macOS
- A Special Weapons Ordnance Device (SWOD), the antiship variant of the Bat (guided bomb)
- The basement area of Selfridges, Oxford Street, named after the four streets - Somerset, Wigmore, Orchard and Duke – that once enclosed it.
