= Plymouth (software) =

Graphical boot software for Linux

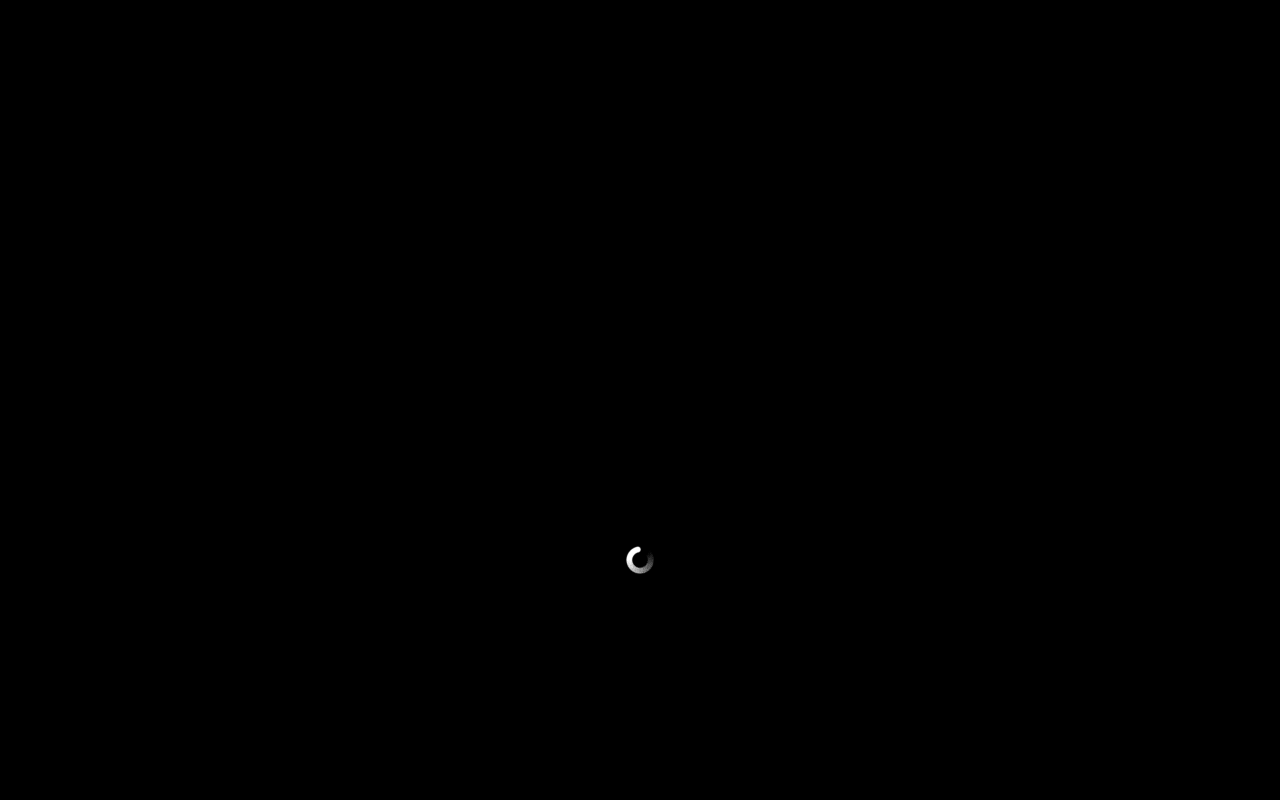
- A screenshot of Plymouth being displayed while booting Red Hat Enterprise Linux
- Original author: Ray Strode
- Release: May 30, 2008
- Stable release: 26.134.222 / 14 May 2026; 58 days ago
- Written in: C
- Operating system: Linux
- Type: Bootsplash
- License: GNU General Public License 2
- Website: Plymouth at freedesktop.org
- Repository: gitlab.freedesktop.org/plymouth/plymouth

Plymouth is an application which provides a graphical boot experience for Linux. Plymouth supports animations using Direct Rendering Manager (DRM) and the KMS driver. Plymouth is bundled with an initial ramdisk which allows it to run before the file system is mounted. Some sources claim that Plymouth is named after Plymouth Rock, symbolizing the program's role as the first thing a user sees, but this has not been confirmed in any official capacity.

== History ==
The development of Plymouth began in May 2007 at Red Hat as a replacement for Red Hat Graphical Boot (RHGB). Fedora became the first distribution to ship Plymouth as default in Fedora 10, replacing RHGB. Ubuntu has included it in since Ubuntu 10.04 LTS "Lucid Lynx".

Plymouth can now be found in much of the desktop Linux space. Some notable examples include: Ubuntu, Fedora, Debian, Linux Mint, MX Linux, and Manjaro Linux.

== Design ==
Plymouth is made up of two components:

- plymouthd, the daemon (or server) component is responsible for display, graphics, and logging.
- plymouth, the client, allows the user to control Plymouth settings, and handles unlocking of encrypted disks.

Plymouth also provides a library, libply.so, to allow developers to create applications that interact with the daemon.

== See also ==
- Usplash
