= Splash screen =

User interface element

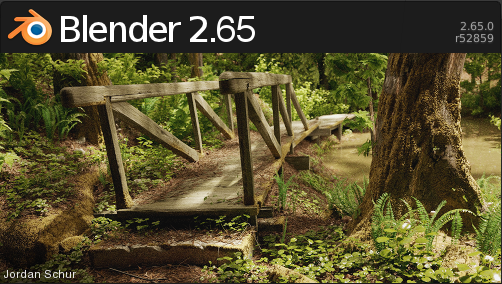
The splash screen for version 2.65 of Blender

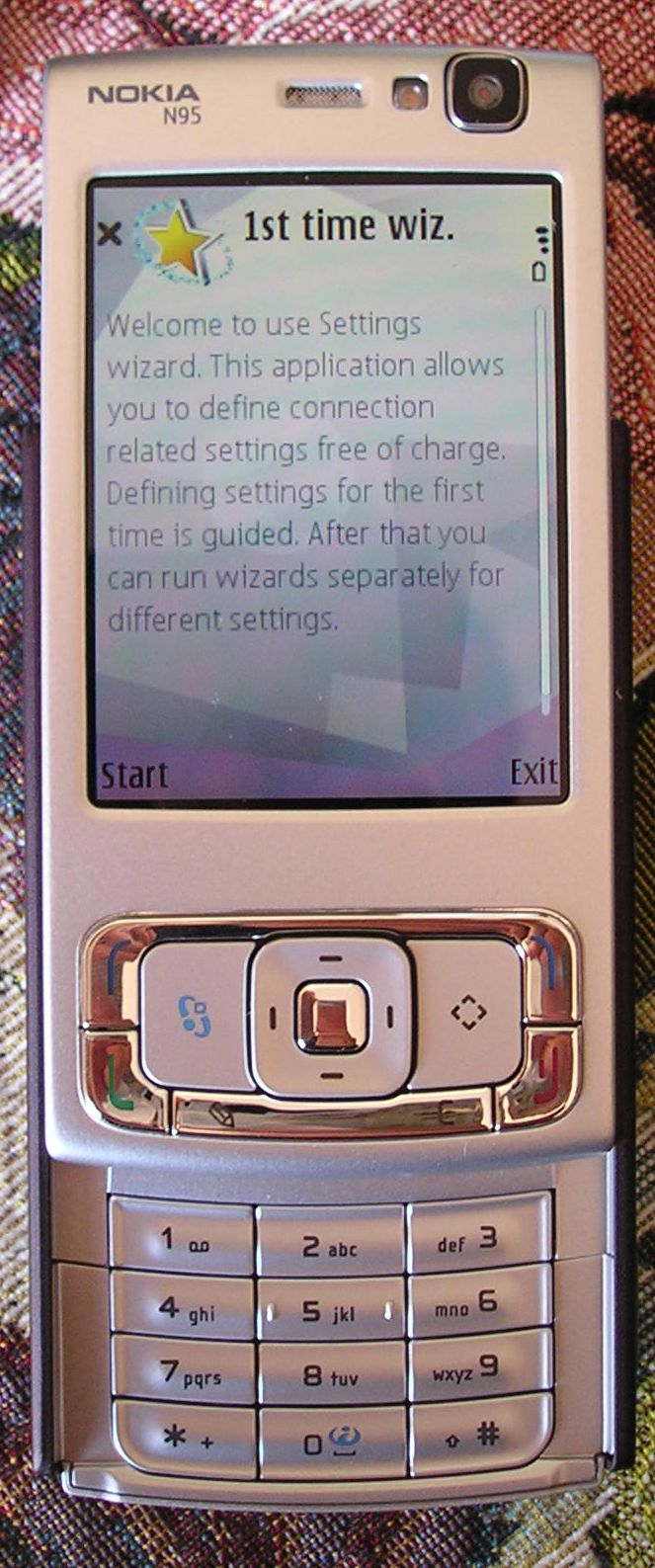
Splash Page of N95 NOKIA

A splash screen is a graphical control element consisting of a window containing an image, a logo, and the current version of the software. A splash screen can appear while a game or program is launching. A splash page is an introduction page on a website. A splash screen may cover the entire screen or web page; or may simply be a rectangle near the center of the screen or page. The splash screens of operating systems and some applications that expect to be run in full screen usually cover the entire screen.

== Purpose ==
Splash screens are typically used by particularly large applications to notify the user that the program is in the process of loading. They provide feedback that a lengthy process is underway. Occasionally, a progress bar within the splash screen indicates the loading progress. A splash screen disappears when the application's main window appears. Splash screens may be added for a period of time and then replaced anew.

Splash screens typically serve to enhance the look and feel of an application or web site, hence they are often visually appealing. They may also have animations, graphics, and sound.

On the Web, a splash screen is a page of a web site that acts as a front page prior to displaying the home page. Designers may use splash pages:

- To direct users to the appropriate website for their country or language preference.
- To direct users to a low-bandwidth site or one more accessible to disabled users.
- As an additional form of advertising.
- to restrict access to content such as pornography, alcohol advertising or sales, or gambling.
- As an aesthetic complement to the main page.
- To grab someone's attention to take them to a page with more details usually for a product that they are selling.

An early use of the splash screen on a Flash website was to enable the site developer to launch the site in a JavaScript-controlled new window without browser elements such as scroll-bars or an address bar, and in the exact size of the Flash movie. This has gone out of style with the predominance of pop-up blockers. Later, many Flash web pages started allowing their audience to choose to go to full screen viewing instead of running in a pop-up window.

Since splash screens often increase the wait for the desired content and may take a long time to load, they are not liked by all users. Web splash screens are especially inconvenient for users with slow internet connections as the first page may take longer to load. Moreover, if the user has turned off rich content, such as images, Flash, or Shockwave, the splash page may not load at all. Splash pages and any associated main pages created in Flash often cannot be accessed by search engines or handled by text readers for the blind.

== Software support ==
The Java programming language has a specific class for creating splash screens, called java.awt.SplashScreen that handles standard splash screen functions, e.g. display an image centered on screen that disappears when the first program window opens.

Splash screens can also be created in HTML and CSS if they are designed for a purpose other than as a loading screen. Instead, they are used for other purposes such as giving the option to pick the language.

The Android operating system (starting with Android 12) automatically generates a splash screen for every installed app, which can be customised by app developers. The Core Splashscreen Jetpack library backports this functionality for older Android versions.

== See also ==
- Bootsplash – splash displayed while booting up the computer
- Interstitial webpage
- Loading screen
- Proxy pattern
- Splash page – comic book terminology
- Title sequence
