= Cursor (user interface) =

Indicator showing where text would be input

A blinking text cursor while typing the word Wikipedia

In human–computer interaction, a cursor is an indicator used to show the current position on a computer monitor or other display device that will respond to input, such as a text cursor or a mouse pointer.

== Etymology ==
Cursor is Latin for 'runner'. A cursor is a name given to the transparent slide engraved with a hairline used to mark a point on a slide rule. The term was then transferred to computers through analogy.

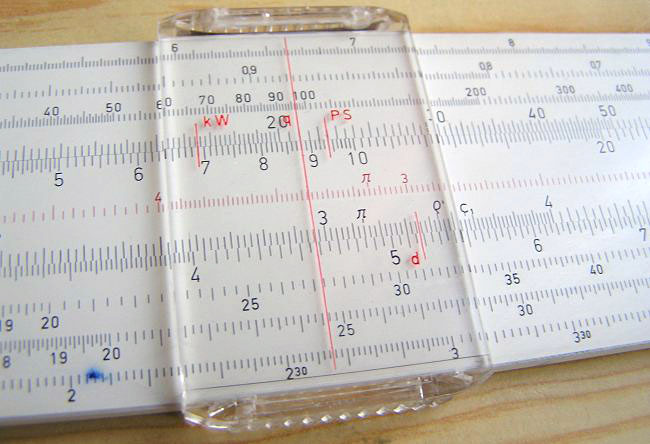
Cursor on a slide rule

According to Roger Bates, a young hardware designer at ARC under Bill English, the cursor on the screen was for some unknown reason also referred to as CAT at the time, which led to calling the new pointing device a mouse as well.

== Text cursor ==
The cursor for the Windows Command Prompt (appearing as an underscore at the end of the line)

In most command-line interfaces or text editors, the text cursor, also known as a caret, is an underscore (_), a reverse block (█), or a vertical bar (|), which may be flashing or steady, indicating where text will be placed when entered (the insertion point). In text mode displays, it was not possible to show a vertical bar between characters to show where the new text would be inserted, so an underscore or block cursor was used instead. In situations where a block was used, the block was usually created by inverting the pixels of the character using the Boolean math exclusive or function. On text editors and word processors of modern design on bitmapped displays, the vertical bar is typically used instead.

In a typical text editing application, the cursor can be moved by pressing various keys. These include the four cursor keys, the Page Up and Page Down keys, the Home key, the End key, and various key combinations involving a modifier key such as the Control key. The position of the cursor also may be changed by moving the mouse pointer to a different location in the document and clicking.

The blinking of the text cursor is usually temporarily suspended when it is being moved; otherwise, the cursor may change position when it is not visible, making its location difficult to follow.

The concept of a blinking cursor can be attributed to Charles Kiesling Sr. via US Patent 3531796, filed in August 1967.

Some interfaces use an underscore or thin vertical bar to indicate that the user is in insert mode, a mode where text will be inserted in the middle of the existing text, and a larger block to indicate that the user is in overtype mode, where inserted text will overwrite existing text. In this way, a block cursor may be seen as a piece of selected text one character wide, since typing will replace the text in the cursor with the new text.

=== Bi-directional text ===
A vertical line text cursor with a small left-pointing or right-pointing appendage is for indicating the direction of text flow on systems that support bi-directional text, and is thus usually known among programmers as a 'bidi cursor'. In some cases, the cursor may split into two parts, each indicating where left-to-right and right-to-left text would be inserted.

== Pointer ==
The common pointer roles for a pointer set

Common pointer types (enlarged)

In computing, a pointer or mouse pointer (as part of a personal computer WIMP style of interaction) is a symbol or graphical image on the computer monitor or other display device that echoes movements of the pointing device, commonly a mouse, touchpad, or stylus pen. It signals the point where actions of the user take place. It can be used in text-based or graphical user interfaces to select and move other elements. The keyboard cursor may also be repositioned using the pointer.

Though it is distinct from the text cursor, the mouse pointer is also called a cursor, mouse cursor or a mouse.

The pointer commonly appears as an angled arrow (angled because historically that improved appearance on low-resolution screens), but it can vary within different programs or operating systems. The use of a pointer is employed when the input method, or pointing device, is a device that can move fluidly across a screen and select or highlight objects on the screen. In GUIs where the input method relies on hard keys, such as the five-way key on many mobile phones, there is no pointer employed, and instead, the GUI relies on a clear focus state.

The pointer echoes movements of the pointing device, commonly a mouse, touchpad or trackball. This kind of pointer is used to manipulate elements of graphical user interfaces such as menus, buttons, scrollbars or any other widget.

=== Appearance ===
A wait pointer replaces the pointer with an hourglass.

The pointer hotspot is the active pixel of the pointer, used to target a click or drag. The standard arrow pointer has the hotspot at the tip; otherwise, it is frequently in the center, though it may reside at any location in the pointer.

In many GUIs, moving the pointer around the screen may reveal other screen hotspots as the pointer changes shape depending on the circumstances. For example:

- In text that the user can select or edit, the pointer changes to a vertical bar with little cross-bars (or curved serif-like extensions) at the top and bottom — sometimes called an I-beam since it resembles the cross-section of the construction detail of the same name.
- When displaying a document, the pointer can appear as a hand with all fingers extended allowing scrolling by pushing the displayed page around.
- Graphics applications often display pointers such as brushes, pencils, or paint buckets, depending on which tool is active.
- On an edge or corner of a window the pointer usually changes into a double arrow (horizontal, vertical, or diagonal) indicating that the user can drag the edge/corner in an indicated direction to adjust the size of the window. Double arrows are similarly used with movable dividers when a window is split into two or more parts.
- The corners and edges of the whole screen may also act as screen hotspots. According to Fitts's law, which predicts the time it takes to reach a target area, moving mouse and stylus pointers to those spots is easy and fast. As the pointer usually stops when reaching a screen edge, the size of those spots can be considered of virtual infinite size, so the hot corners and edges can be reached quickly by throwing the pointer toward the edges.
- While a computer process is performing tasks and cannot accept user input, a wait pointer (an hourglass in Windows before Vista and many other systems, a spinning ring in Windows Vista and later, a watch in classic Mac OS, or a spinning pinwheel in macOS) is displayed when the mouse pointer is in the corresponding window.
- When the pointer hovers over a hyperlink, a mouseover event changes the pointer into a hand with an outstretched index finger. Often some informative text about the link may pop up in a tooltip, which disappears when the user moves the pointer away. The tooltips revealed in the box depend on the implementation of the web browser; many web browsers will display the title of the element (most common nowadays), the alt attribute (historically), or the non-standard tooltips attribute. This pointer shape was first used for hyperlinks in Apple Computer's HyperCard.
- In Windows 7, when Windows Touch was introduced in the mainstream to make Windows more touch-friendly, a touch pointer is displayed instead of the mouse pointer. The touch pointer can be switched off in Control Panel and resembles a small diamond shape. When the screen is touched a blue ripple appears around the touch pointer to provide visual touch feedback. When swiping to scroll etc., the touch pointer would follow the finger as it moves. If touch and hold to right-click is enabled, touching and holding will show a thick white ring around the touch pointer. When this ring appears, releasing one's finger would perform a right-click.
  - If a pen is used the left-click ripple is colorless instead of blue and the right-click ring is a thinner ring that appears closer to the pen tip making contact with the screen. A click (either left or right) will not show the touch pointer, but swiping would still show the pointer which would follow the pen tip.
  - Also, the touch pointer would only appear on the desktop once a user has signed in to Windows 7. On the sign-in screen, the mouse pointer would simply jump to the point touched and a left click would be sent on a tap, similar to when a touch input is used on operating systems before Windows 7.
- In Windows 8 and above with a touchscreen, visual touch feedback displays a translucent circle where the finger makes contact with the screen, and a square when attempting to touch and hold to right-click. A swipe is shown by a translucent line of varying thickness. Feedback can be switched on and off in Pen and Touch settings of the Control Panel in Windows 8 and Windows 8.1 or in the Settings app on Windows 10, and feedback can also be made darker and larger where it needs to be emphasized, such as when presenting. However, the touch pointer is normally less commonly visible in touchscreen environments of Windows operating systems later than Windows 7.
- The mouse-over or hover gesture can also show a tooltip, which presents information about what the pointer is hovering over; the information is a description of what selecting an active element is for or what it will do. The tooltip appears only when stationary over the content. A common use of viewing the information is when browsing the internet to know the destination of a link before selecting it, if the URL of the text is not recognizable.
  - When using touch or a pen with Windows, hovering when supported or performing a set gesture or flick may show the tooltip.

==== I-beam pointer ====
The I-beam pointer

The I-beam pointer (also called the I-cursor) is a cursor shaped like a serifed capital letter I. The purpose of this cursor is to indicate that the text beneath the cursor can be highlighted and sometimes inserted or changed.

=== Pointer trails and animation ===
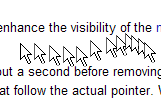
An example of mouse pointer trails

Pointer trails can be used to enhance its visibility during movement. Pointer trails are a feature of GUI operating systems to enhance the visibility of the pointer. Although disabled by default, pointer trails have been an option in every version of Microsoft Windows since Windows 3.1x. The option was likely included to improve cursor visibility on low-cost DSTN panels included in laptops of the era. Due to the typically high response times of these passive-matrix displays, rapid mouse movements would cause the cursor to intermittently vanish.

When pointer trails are active and the mouse or stylus is moved, the system waits a moment before removing the pointer image from the old location on the screen. A copy of the pointer persists at every point that the pointer has visited at that moment, resulting in a snake-like trail of pointer icons that follow the actual pointer. When the user stops moving the mouse or removes the stylus from the screen, the trails disappear and the pointer returns to normal.

Pointer trails have been provided as a feature mainly for users with poor vision and for screens where low visibility may become an issue, such as LCD screens in bright sunlight.

In Windows, pointer trails may be enabled in the Control Panel, usually under the Mouse applet.

Introduced with Windows NT, an animated pointer was a small looping animation that was played at the location of the pointer. This is used, for example, to provide a visual cue that the computer is busy with a task. After their introduction, many animated pointers became available for download from third party suppliers. Animated pointers are not without their problems. In addition to imposing a small additional load on the CPU, the animated pointer routines did introduce a security vulnerability. A client-side exploit known as the Windows Animated Cursor Remote Code Execution Vulnerability used a buffer overflow vulnerability to load malicious code via the animated cursor load routine of Windows.

== 3D cursor ==
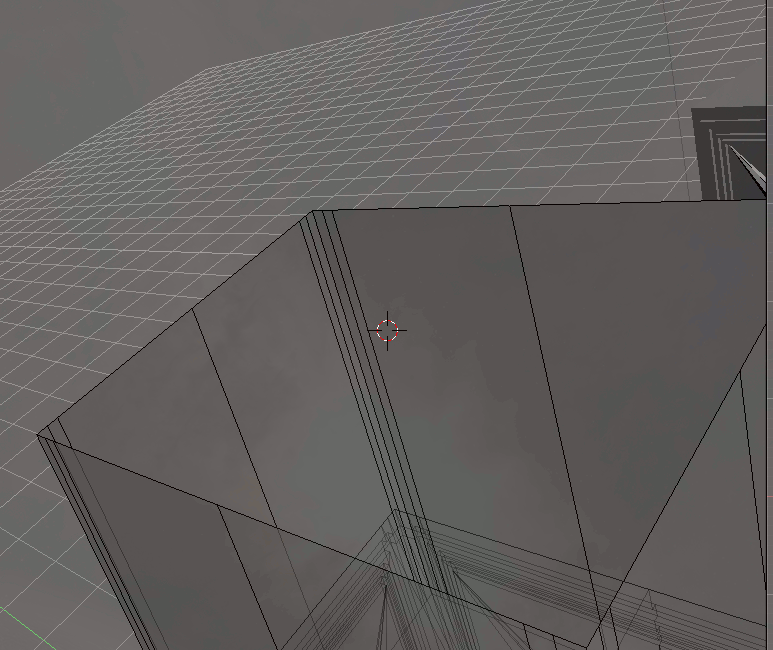
An example of the 3D cursor within Blender (center)

The idea of a cursor being used as a marker or insertion point for new data or transformations, such as rotation, can be extended to a 3D modeling environment. Blender, for instance, uses a 3D cursor to determine where operations such as placing meshes are to take place in the 3D viewport.

== See also ==
- Susan Kare, designer of several of the common cursor shapes
- Microangelo Toolset
- Throbber
- Tooltip
- Cursorial
- CopyCursor, a feature found in Acorn MOS (1981), RISC OS (1987), the Amstrad CPC series (1984) and the extended DOS keyboard drivers K3PLUS/FreeKEYB (1991)
