= Throbber =

Animated graphic to indicate background action is being performed

An example of a throbber in motion

A throbber, also known as a loading icon, is an animated graphical control element used to show that a computer program is performing an action in the background, such as downloading content, conducting intensive calculations, or communicating with an external device. In contrast to a progress bar, a throbber does not indicate how much of the action has been completed.

== History ==
An early use of a throbber occurred in the NCSA Mosaic web browser of the early 1990s, which featured an NCSA logo that animated while Mosaic downloaded a web page. As the user could still interact with the program, the pointer remained normal (and not a busy symbol, such as an hourglass); therefore, the throbber provided a visual indication that the program was performing an action.

The Netscape web browser also featured a throbber. In version 1.0 of Netscape, this took the form of a big blue "N" (Netscape's logo at the time). The animation depicted the "N" expanding and contracting – hence the name "throbber".

The IBM WebExplorer offered a webpage the opportunity to change the look and the animation of the throbber by using proprietary HTML code.

The Arena web browser has a command-line option to change the throbber with a local file.

== Spinning wheel ==
Loading screen in the Telegram app

Throbbers also appear in client side applications (such as Ajax web apps) where an application within the web browser would wait for some operation to complete. Most of these throbbers appear as a "spinning wheel", which typically consist of 8, 10, or 12 part-radial lines or discs arranged in a circle, as if on a clock face, highlighted in turn as if a wave is moving clockwise around the circle.

flatpak update running in a virtual terminal (spinner can be seen on the left when packages are being downloaded)

In text user interfaces and command lines, the spinning wheel is commonly replaced by a fixed-width character which is cycled through discrete states, such as "|", "/", "-" and "\", which act as the frames of a looping animation-like effect. Unlike graphical activity indicators, this style of throbber is commonly paired with a progress display like a bar, since the lower effective resolution of character-based progress bars can benefit from a separate indication of activity. Often, the spinner is displayed at or near the position of the typing cursor, then called a "spinning cursor" or "rotating cursor". This style of throbber dates from versions of UNIX appearing in the latter 1970s, and DR-DOS utilities in the 1980s, since it requires at least a character-cell addressable display—i.e. one which can be updated quickly to make precise changes to already displayed text—but given that is otherwise simple to program.

== See also ==
- Spinning pinwheel
- Windows wait cursor
