= Comparison of image viewers =

This article presents a comparison of image viewers and image organizers which can be used for image viewing.

== Functionality overview and licensing ==
Name	View functions	Other functions	License
ACDSee	Thumbnails (user-defined sizes), fullscreen, slideshow, zoom, fit, view Exif info, view inside ZIP archives, ...	Resize, crop, rotate, flip, JPEG lossless rotate/mirror, face recognition, adjust exposure and colors etc., filters (sharpen, blur, average, emboss), red eye removal, batch rename, edit Exif info	Proprietary
Adobe Bridge	Thumbnails, slideshow, filmstrip, preview, versions with alternates	Stand Alone: rotate, rename, delete, move, copy, batch rename, add/Edit metadata, camera raw image adjustments: crop, resize, exposure, contrast, white balance, curves Via Photoshop: contact sheet, merge to HDR, PDF presentation, photomerge, Web picture gallery	Proprietary
Adobe Lightroom	Library organization, RAW and JPEG editing, slideshow tools, print layout and preferences, web gallery creation and uploading		Proprietary
Aperture			Proprietary
CDisplay	Fit to window, zoom, print, full-screen, slideshow, image collection, image information...	Rotate, flip, save as, used for reading comics and manga.	Proprietary
Darktable	Lighttable (contact sheet), darkroom (image editing), map, tethering	Non-destructive RAW photo editing (like Adobe Lightroom) as well as common image formats	GPL-3.0-or-later
digiKam	Fit to window, zoom, pan, light table, slideshow with effects, OpenGL viewer	Rotate, crop, vertical/horizontal flip, lossless JPEG operations (90° steps), color management, 16bit color depth, Light Table, Exif, IPTC, XMP, GPS metadata, adjust colors/brightness/levels, elaborate Black and White conversion, automatic lens correction, anti-vignetting, sharpening tools, vibrance, many filters, face recognition, Batch operations, export to archive, HTML, flickr, gallery2, picasaweb, smugmug, iPod, Facebook, 23hq, flash.	GPL-2.0-or-later
Eye of GNOME	Fit to window, zoom, flip, rotate, full-screen, slideshow, image collection, image information	Delete, print, save, rename, set wallpaper	GPL-2.0-or-later
F-Spot	Full-screen, slideshow, zoom, multiple sizes of thumbnails. Export: HTML, Flickr, Gallery Project, Picasa, Facebook (via extension) and O.r.i.g.i.n.a.l	Tags, rotate in single degree increments, hue, contrast, white balance, colour, sharpen, soft focus, crop, auto red-eye reduction. Files stored at /user/Pictures/Photos/[year]/[month]/[day]	MIT
FastPictureViewer	Borderless full-screen kiosk mode, Fit-to-window, 1:1, 50% to 6400% magnifier, multicore-enabled, GPU-based panning/zooming, black & white preview and lost shadows/highlights view.	File renaming, single-click background copy/move to preset location, single-click rating/labeling (writes Adobe XMP sidecar files and/or embeds XMP metadata within JPEG/TIFF/HD Photo/JPEG XR), Windows rating, color management including custom target profile selection, Unicode support, Exif shooting data (shutter speed, f-stop, ISO speed, exposure compensation) and real-time, seamless R,G,B histogram in translucent floating window. IPTC metadata editor in the registered version.	Proprietary
FastStone Image Viewer	All major formats, thumbnail view (6 predefined sizes), full screen, magnifier, slideshow. Uses second monitor for fullscreen preview. Popups image gallery, detailed image informations, editing options at the image border in fullscreen modus.	Many editing features: rotate, move, rename, 150+ transitional effects, crop, resize, clone, heal, convert format, color adjust, sharpen, drop shadow effects, scanner support, histogram. JPEG lossless rotate/flip/crop.	Proprietary
Geeqie	Full-screen, slideshow, zoom, color spectrum, 14 sizes of thumbnails	Rotate, move, rename, hue, contrast, find/remove duplicates	GPL-2.0-or-later
Gonvisor	Fit to window, zoom, print, full-screen, slideshow, image collection, image information, view images in compressed ZIP, RAR, or 7z files.	Rotate, flip, save as, used for reading comics and manga	Proprietary
GraphicConverter	Full-screen, slideshow	Rotate, move, rename	Proprietary
gThumb	Full-screen, slideshow, zoom, color spectrum, three sizes of thumbnails	Rotate, move, rename, hue, contrast	GPL-2.0-or-later
Gwenview	Fullscreen, slideshow, zoom, rotate, adjust gamma/contrast/brightness, disk navigator, file tree, thumbnails, extended thumbnails, bookmarks...	Add border, filter, effects, resize, rename, raw image converter, recompress, edit color. Share using 23, Dropbox, Facebook, Flickr, Google drive, Google photos/Picasaweb, Imageshack, Imgur, Piwigo, Rajce.net, remote storage, SmugMug, Yandex.Fotki, Zooomr	GPL-2.0-only or GPL-3.0-only
ImageGlass			GPL-3.0-or-later
iPhoto	Thumbnails, fullscreen, slideshow, camera information, search, tags, organize by event or album, auto organize by date during first import	Lossless JPEG rotate, cropping (custom and template), brightness/contrast adjustment, red-eye reduction, retouch, color enhancement, B&W and sepia conversion, export to multiple formats & sizes	Proprietary
IrfanView	Thumbnails (18 pre-defined sizes from 50×50–800×800 pixels), fullscreen, slideshow, zoom, fit (several options), view IPTC and Exif info, hex view, histogram (also RGB); Format detection with offer to rename, set wallpaper, EXE/SCR creation, Burn slideshow to CD; directory tree 32 languages (version 4.28/4.30)	Add Text, crop, cut/copy selected area, paste-Into selected area, paste from print screen, resize/resample, rotate, flip vertically/horizontally, JPEG lossless transformations, color adjustments, change color depth, greyscale, red-eye reduction, sharpen, effects/filters, own and 8bf (Photoshop) plugins compatibility, edit IPTC info, move, copy, delete, rename, convert, batch conversion, batch renaming/resizing/cropping, panorama creation, send email, also via IrfanView Thumbnails/Plugins: contact sheet creation, thumbnail creation, web gallery creation, face detection	Free for non-commercial use
KPhotoAlbum	Zoom, rotate, metadata, Exif, thumbnails (customize size), slideshow, categories	As Available per KIPI plugins	GPL-2.0-or-later
Loupe	Fullscreen, zoom, rotate, metadata	Print, delete, sandboxed decoding, support for touchpad and touchscreen gestures	GPL-3.0-or-later
Phase One Media Pro	Thumbnails, slideshow, zoom, print, light table, library organization, best practice DAM	Rotate, rename, delete, batch rename, add/edit metadata (IPTC, EXIF, Custom), free reader app to distribute catalogs	Proprietary
PhotoNavigator	Multi image browse, autobrowse, global community light table sharing, WebCam and chatrooms, Thumbnails, fullscreen	slideshow, zoom, print, camera information, events, rotate, mirror, flip, red eye reduction, crop, auto enhance, exposure, saturation, tint, temperature, shadows, revert to original, rename, straighten	Proprietary
Photos (Apple)			Proprietary
Photos (Windows)	fullscreen, slideshow, fit, zoom, print		Proprietary
Picasa	Zoom, lossless rotate, histogram, camera information, Thumbnails (fully adjustable), Slide Show (Full Screen w/zoom), Magnifier, Search, Search for faces	Crop, straighten, redeye, color tweaking, retouch, tuning, add text, numerous effects, batch edit, batch rename, video rendering, HTML gallery creation, photo browser application creator, screensaver, face recognition, keyword tagging, geo-tagging, photo collage, original file preservation, reorganize storage	Proprietary
Preview	Zoom, rotate, metadata	Crop, straighten, color tweaking, profile assignment	Proprietary
Shotwell	Thumbnails, fullscreen, slideshow, zoom, print, camera information, events	Auto enhance, rotate, mirror, flip, red eye reduction, crop, exposure, saturation, tint, temperature, shadows, revert to original, rename, straighten, change time/date, publish to Facebook, Picasa Web Albums, Flickr	LGPL-2.1-or-later
STDU Viewer	Fullscreen, fit to window, zoom, print	rotate, brightness, contrast, gamma setting	Proprietary
Windows Photo Gallery	Fullscreen, slideshow, fit, zoom, print	Panorama stitching, adjust brightness, contrast, color saturation/hue, filters, stitching, rotate, straightening and skew, face recognition	Proprietary
Windows Photo Viewer	Fullscreen, slideshow, fit, zoom, print	Rotate, lossy JPEG rotate, annotate TIFF images	Proprietary
XnView Classic and MP	Thumbnails (user-defined sizes), fullscreen, slideshow, zoom, fit, view IPTC and Exif info	Resize, crop, rotate, flip, JPEG lossless rotate/flip/crop, adjust exposure and colors etc., filters (sharpen, blur, average, emboss), batch convert, batch rename, edit IPTC info	Free for non-commercial use
Xv	View as ASCII or hex, magnify, determine pixel values	Crop, pad, resize, rotate, flip, brightness, contrast, gamma, saturation, hue, colormap, reduce colors, dither, convert, and more	Proprietary
Zoner Photo Studio	Thumbnails (user-defined sizes), fullscreen, histogram, slideshow with transition effects, auto rotation, JPEG lossless rotate, pan, zoom, fit, IPTC and Exif info, GPS support, full Unicode support, free version does not support color profiles	Resize, crop, rotate, flip, JPEG lossless rotate/mirror, adjust exposure, colors, contrast, saturation, hue, white balance, levels, curves, gamma correction, filters (sharpen, blur, soften, edge, emboss, average, grayscale, ...), .8bf (Photoshop) plugins compatibility, color management, batch operations, image conversions with reduced/dithered colors, batch rename, red eye removal, edit ITPC, XMP and Exif info, time creation offset, merge to HDR, PDF presentation, panorama creation, lens correction, anti-vignetting, web picture gallery, DNG/RAW image converter, TWAIN scanners support, send pictures via e-mail, 3D pictures, dynamic calendar generation, support for WIC codecs (RAW processing)	Proprietary
Name	View functions	Other functions	License

== Supported file formats ==
=== Commonly used vendor-independent formats ===
Program	Comic book	PDF	BMP	JPEG	PNG	TIFF	GIF	PSD	Other graphics file formats
ACDSee	CBR, CBZ		BMP	JPEG	PNG	TIFF	GIF	PSD	ACDSee reads 9 compression formats and writes to 2, reads 33 video formats, and supports 61 image formats and writes to 16, including EMF, PCX, PIC, PICT, PSD, PSP, SGI, TGA, WMF, XBM, various camera formats among others
Adobe Bridge									Displays all file types supported by Adobe Creative Suite
Aperture		PDF		JPEG	PNG	TIFF	GIF	PSD	PSD, OLY, Various video formats including: AVI, MOV, MPEG
CDisplay	CBZ, CBR, CBT, CBA		BMP	JPEG	PNG		GIF		
digiKam			BMP	JPEG	PNG	TIFF	GIF		JPEG 2000, PCX, WMF, PNM, PPM, XCF, XPM, PGX, MPEG, MPO, MPE, AVI, MOV, ASF, PGF, MP4
Eye of GNOME			BMP	JPEG	PNG	TIFF	GIF		PNM, RAS, ICO, XPM, SVG
F-Spot				JPEG	PNG	TIFF	GIF		PPM, SVG
FastPictureViewer			BMP	JPEG	PNG	TIFF		PSD	HD Photo, HDP, WDP, JPEG XR (+ RLE, DIB, ICO, MTIFF in the registered edition, as well as DjVu, TGA, PSD, HDR, DDS, EXR, J2K, PNM, PBM, PGM, PBM, LRPREV, JPS through additional WIC codecs from the optional FastPictureViewer Codec Pack or from 3rd parties)
FastStone Image Viewer			BMP	JPEG	PNG	TIFF	GIF	PSD	loading of: JPEG 2000, PCX, WMF, ICO, CUR, TGA, CRW, FAX, JFIF, HEIC, WEBP saving to: BMP, GIF, JPEG, JPEG 2000, PCX, PNG, PPM, TGA, TIFF, PDF
Geeqie		PDF	BMP	JPEG	PNG	TIFF	GIF	PSD	ANI, APM, CUR, ICNS, ICO, JP2/JPC/JPX/J2K/JPF, JPS, MPO, PCX, PBM/PGM/PNM/PPM, QIF/QTIF (QuickTime Image Format), RAS (Sun Raster), SVG/SVGZ, TGA/TARGA, WBMP, WMF, XBM, XPM
Gonvisor	CBZ, CBR, CBA, CB7	PDF	BMP	JPEG	PNG		GIF		Opens images contained in rar, zip, ace and 7zip files.
GraphicConverter		PDF	BMP	JPEG	PNG	TIFF	GIF	PSD	190 types read, 79 types saved
gThumb			BMP	JPEG	PNG	TIFF	GIF		
Gwenview			BMP	JPEG	PNG	TIFF	GIF	PSD	MNG, SVG, XCF, RAW (NEF), etc.
ImageGlass			BMP	JPEG	PNG	TIFF	GIF	PSD	Supports many different formats including AVIF, HEIF, HEIC, JPEG XL, WebP
iPhoto				JPEG	PNG		GIF	PSD	RAW (All QuickTime supported images), PSD (Leopard), AVI (Leopard), MOV (Leopard)
IrfanView		PDF	BMP	JPEG	PNG	TIFF	GIF	PSD	~70 types including : AIF, ANI/CUR, ASF, AU/SND, AVI, B3D, DIB, CAM (Casio JPG), CLP, DDS, Dicom/ACR, DJVU, ECW, EMF/WMF, EPS/PS, FITS, FlashPix (FPX), FSH, G3, HDR, ICO/ICL/EXE/DLL, IFF/LBM, IMG (GEM), JPEG 2000, JPM, KDC, LDF, LWF, MED, MID/RMI, MNG/JNG, MOV, MP3, MPG, MrSID, NLM/NOL/NGG, OGG, PBM/PGM/PPM, PCX/DCX, PhotoCD, PIC, PSD, PSP, RAS/SUN, RAW, Real Audio (RA), RLE, SFF, SFW, SGI/RGB, SWF (Flash/Shockwave), TGA, TTF, TXT, WAD, WAL, WAV, WBMP, WBZ/WBC, XBM, XPM, CAD formats. Partial support: MOV, QTIF, Mac PICT, FLI/FLC, SVG. Note that some modes don't display large animated GIF files entirely (for example the Slideshow mode).
KPhotoAlbum									Photo formats supported by KDE; AVI, MPEG, RAW
Loupe		PDF	BMP	JPEG	PNG	TIFF	GIF	PSD	AVIF, DDS, farbfeld, QOI, HEIC, ICO, JPEG XL, OpenEXR, PNM, SVG, TGA, WEBP
Phase One Media Pro		PDF		JPEG	PNG	TIFF	GIF	PSD	Supports over 100 file formats for images, videos and documents, including: PSD, IIQ, CR, EIP, DOC
Photos (Windows)		PDF	BMP	JPEG	PNG	TIFF	GIF	PSD	AVIF, GIF, HEIC (with extension), ICO, JXR, RAW, THUMB, WEBP
Picasa			BMP	JPEG	PNG	TIFF	GIF		8 types including TGA, RAW, and some movie formats
Preview		PDF	BMP	JPEG	PNG	TIFF	GIF		All QuickTime images:
Shotwell				JPEG	PNG	TIFF	GIF		RAW and some video formats
STDU Viewer		PDF	BMP	JPEG	PNG	TIFF (multipage)	GIF	PSD	TXT, EMF, WMF, DjVu, XPS
Windows Photo Viewer			BMP	JPEG	PNG	TIFF (multipage)	GIF		WMF, EMF, ICO
XnView Classic and MP		PDF	BMP	JPEG (IPTC&Exif)	PNG	TIFF (multipage)	GIF	PSD	Reads over 500, writes over 70 image formats Reads audio and video file formats
Xv			BMP	JPEG	PNG (with patch)	TIFF	GIF		PBM, PGM, PPM, XPM, Sun Rasterfile, Targa, RGB, PCX, FITS, PM, PostScript
Zoner Photo Studio			BMP	JPEG	PNG	TIFF	GIF/aGIF	PSD	HDP/WDP, PSB, PSP/PSPIMAGE, DIB/RLE, J2K/JPC/JP2, PAM, PBM, PGM, PNM, PCD, PCX, WBMP/WBM, TGA, ICO, MAC, WPG, BMI, MDM, THN, DCM, stereo pictures: JPS, PNS, BMS.
Program	Comic book	PDF	BMP	JPEG	PNG	TIFF	GIF	PSD	Other graphics file formats

=== Camera raw formats ===
Program	ARW Sony	CR2 Canon	DNG Adobe	NEF Nikon	ORF Olympus	PEF Pentax	RAF Fujifilm	SRW Samsung	X3F Sigma	Others	Notes
ACDSee	ARW	CR2	DNG	NEF	ORF	PEF	RAF	SRW	X3F	cRAW, CRW, DCR, ERF, HDR, MRW, RAW, RWL, sRAW	
Aperture	ARW	CR2	DNG	NEF	ORF	PEF	RAF	SRW	X3F	CRW, MOS, RAW, FFF, 3FR	
digiKam	ARW	CR2	DNG	NEF	ORF	PEF	RAF	SRW	X3F	Several	
F-Spot	ARW?	CR2	DNG	NEF	ORF	PEF	RAF	SRW?	X3F?	CRW, MRW, RAW, SRF	
FastPictureViewer (registered edition)	ARW	CR2	DNG	NEF	ORF	PEF	RAF	SRW	X3F	NRW, RW2, SR2, SRF, RWZ etc.	
FastStone Image Viewer	ARW	CR2	DNG	NEF	ORF	PEF	RAF	SRW	X3F	CR3, CRW, NRW, RWL, MRW, SR2, SRF, RW2	
Geeqie	ARW	CR2	DNG	NEF	ORF	PEF	RAF	SRW	X3F	3FR, CRW, DCR, ERF, K25, KDC, MEF, MOS, MRW, PTX, R3D, RAW, SR2, SRF	
ImageGlass	ARW	CR2	DNG	NEF	ORF	PEF	RAF	SRW	X3F	CRW and more	
IrfanView	ARW	CR2	DNG	NEF	ORF	PEF	RAF	SRW	X3F	CRW, EEF, DCR, MRW, NRW, RW2, SRF	
Phase One Media Pro	ARW?	CR2?	DNG	NEF	ORF?	PEF?	RAF	SRW	X3F?	CRW, MOS, RAW	
Photos (Windows)	ARW	CR2	DNG	NEF	ORF	PEF	RAF	SRW	X3F	CRW, MOS, RAW	
Picasa	ARW	CR2	DNG	NEF	ORF	PEF	RAF	SRW	X3F	3FR, CRW, DCR, KDC, MRW, NRW, RAW, RW2, SRF, SR2	
Shotwell	ARW?	CR2?	DNG?	NEF?	ORF?	PEF?	RAF?	SRW?	X3F?		Support "limited", export 8-bit only
XnView Classic and MP	ARW	CR2	DNG	NEF	ORF	PEF	RAF	SRW	X3F	CRW, RWZ and more	
Zoner Photo Studio	ARW	CR2	DNG	NEF	ORF	PEF	RAF	SRW	X3F	3FR, CRW, ERF, KDC, MEF, MRW, RAW, RW2, RWZ, SR2, SRF	

== Supported operating systems ==
Name	Windows	macOS	Linux	BSD
ACDSee	Yes	Yes	No	No
Adobe Bridge	Yes	Yes	No	No
Adobe Lightroom	Yes	Yes	No	No
Aperture	No	Yes	No	No
CDisplay	Yes	No	No	No
digiKam	Yes	Yes	Yes	Yes
Eye of GNOME (aka Image Viewer)	No	No	Yes	Yes
F-Spot	No	No	Yes	No
FastPictureViewer	Yes	No	No	No
FastStone Image Viewer	Yes	No	No	No
Geeqie	No	Yes	Yes	Yes
Gonvisor	Yes	Yes	No	No
GraphicConverter	No	Yes	No	No
gThumb	No	No	Yes	Yes
Gwenview	No	No	Yes	Yes
ImageGlass	Yes	No	No	No
iPhoto	No	Yes	No	No
IrfanView	Yes	No	No	No
KPhotoAlbum	No	No	Yes	Yes
Loupe (aka Image Viewer)	No	No	Yes	Yes
Phase One Media Pro	Yes	Yes	No	No
Photos (Apple)	No	Yes	No	No
Photos (Windows)	Yes	No	No	No
Picasa	Yes	Yes	No	No
Preview	No	Yes	No	No
Shotwell	No	No	Yes	Yes
STDU Viewer	Yes	No	No	No
Windows Photo Gallery	Yes	No	No	No
Windows Photo Viewer	Yes	No	No	No
XnView Classic	Yes	No	No	No
XnView MP	Yes	Yes	Yes	No
Xv	No	No	Yes	Yes
Zoner Photo Studio	Yes	No	No	No

== Basic features ==
Program	Fullscreen	slideshow	zoom (styles)	cache decoded images	thumbnails (sizes)	thumbnail caching	navigation views	print	sort (schemes)
ACDSee	Yes	Yes	Yes; 1:1, fit width and/or height, lock	Yes previous, next	Yes user-defined	Yes database	directory-tree, albums, calendar, favourites, search results	Yes	Yes user-defined, name, date, size, type, ...
CDisplay	Yes	Yes	Yes; 1:1, fit over/under width/height, fullscreen, doublepage		Yes; Fixed, with scroll		Thumbnails(of current folder images or archive)	No	No
digiKam	Yes	Yes	Yes fit, in/out	Yes previous, next	Yes adjustable size	Yes	Yes album-tree, tags, calendar, searches, map (geolocation)	Yes	Partial tags, date, keywords, metadata; no user-defined order
Eye of GNOME	Yes	Yes	Yes +/-, 1:1, best fit		image collection pane, only one row		Thumbnails(of current folder images)	Yes	No
F-Spot	Yes	Yes	Yes		Yes		list, file-tree		Yes keywords
FastPictureViewer	Yes	Yes; Auto-advance mode	Yes; 1:1, fit, 50%-6400% magnifier, click-and-hold zooming	Yes dynamic, adaptive	Yes; 96x96px, shown on navigation slider (Vista or later)	Yes (uses OS-managed cache on Windows Vista or later)	Yes; Windowed or full-screen, back and forth navigation, bookmarks, navigation slider	No	Yes Filenames, file creation/modification date, Exif date taken, GPS timestamp
FastStone Image Viewer	Yes	Yes	Yes; 1:1, 2%-5000% magnifier, click-and-hold zooming, fit width and/or height, lock	No	Yes; 6 predefined sizes	Yes database	dir-tree, back and forth navigation, bookmarks	Yes	Yes user-defined, name, date, file size, image size, type
Geeqie	Yes	Yes	Yes fit, 1:1, in/out	Yes previous, next	Yes; 24x24 - 256x256	Yes as png-files centrally or in sub-dir	list, dir-tree, collection	Yes	Yes collections, keywords, directory
gThumb	Yes	Yes random, forward, reverse	Yes fit, 1:1, remember, fit-if-larger, in/out		Yes; 48x48 - 256x256, 9 sizes	Partial Newer versions cache in a central directory	list, icon, subfolders, categories, catalog	Yes	Yes catalogs, categories
Gwenview	Yes	Yes	Yes fit, 1:1, fit-if-larger, zoom to 1600%		Yes adjustable size	Yes	Yes fullscreen thumbnails, dir-tree	Yes	Yes name, size, date
IrfanView	Yes	Yes	Yes; 1:1, fit width and/or height, lock	No	Yes; 18 predefined sizes: 50×50–800×800	No	dir-tree, search results	Yes	Yes name, date, file size, image width/height, type, user-defined
KPhotoAlbum	Yes	Yes	Yes fit, in/out, presets		Yes		views search results		by date
Phase One Media Pro	Yes	Yes	Yes; Fit to viewing area/height/width, 1:1, zoom to 1600%	Yes	Yes; Yes, user-defined	Yes; Database	Yes Catalog-sets, date, filetypes, events, author, people, by search, by keywords and all metadata	Yes	Yes name, date, size, user-defined
Photos (Windows)	Yes	Yes	Yes	Yes	Yes	Yes	Yes	Yes	Partial; Date taken, created, modified, name
Picasa	Partial only in slideshow mode	Yes	Partial no view window, fit to viewing area, 1:1, zoom to 400%	No	Yes user defined	Yes database	directory-tree, albums, timeline	Yes	Partial name, date, size, user-defined
Shotwell	Yes	Yes	Yes	No	Yes fixed size	Yes	Thumbs, Events (dates), tags	Yes	Yes; Title, Exposure Date
STDU Viewer	Yes	No	Yes fit to width, fit to height, fit to size	No	Yes	No	No	Yes	No
Windows Photo Viewer	Yes	Yes	Yes; 1:1, fit, in/out	Yes	No	No	No	Yes	No
XnView Classic and MP	Yes	Yes	Yes; 1:1, fit width and/or height, lock	Yes previous, next	Yes user-defined	Yes database	dir-tree, favourites, categories	Yes	Yes name, date, size, type, etc.; user-defined order
Xv	No	Yes		No	Yes fixed size	Yes in subdirectory (.xvpics)		Yes	Partial name
Zoner Photo Studio	Yes	Yes	Yes; 1:1, fit width and/or height, lock	Yes in Viewer, previous and next	Yes user-defined	Yes database	dir-tree, albums, CD compilations, media archive, search results, web albums	Yes contact sheet, templates, calendars, paper saver	Yes name, date, size, type, etc.; user-defined order
Program	Fullscreen	slideshow	zoom (styles)	cache decoded images	thumbnails (sizes)	thumbnail caching	navigation views	print	sort (schemes)

== Additional features ==
Program	search (criteria)	selection (styles)	metadata	adjust image (functions)	hotkeys	color management (ICC)	JPEG Lossless operations	Unicode support	other / special
ACDSee	Yes	Yes individual, linear, block	Yes; Exif, IPTC	Yes many	Yes	Yes	Yes rotation only	Yes	GPS Location, Scripts for batch/pre processing, automatic slideshow
CDisplay	No	No	Yes	Yes; Rotate, Filter	Yes configurable	Yes	No	No	Slider, automatic slideshow, mouse control
digiKam	Yes file name, comments, most Exif and meta data	Yes linear, block, complex	Yes; Exif and IPTC	Yes many editing function	Yes	Yes	Yes by changing EXIF orientation and not in editor	Yes	Geotagging, batch processing, detect duplicate/similar images, export to Internet/social media/HTML
Eye of GNOME	No	No	Yes	Yes; Rotate	Yes unconfigurable		Yes		
F-Spot			Yes						Export to HTML, Flickr, or O.r.i.g.i.n.a.l.
FastPictureViewer	Yes; Filter the view by rating, file name...	Yes; Copy, move, delete, rate, label	Yes; Write XMP Rating/Label, IPTC metadata, Windows Rating, embedded or in sidecar files, shows shooting info (Exif) and realtime RGB histogram	No	Yes	Yes (supports custom monitor profile, direct conversion from image colorspace to monitor colorspace, ICC v4)	N/A	Yes, native	Native 32 and 64-bit, Tethered shooting (MTP/PTP over USB), Multicore-aware, DirectX accelerated, HD Photo / JPEG XR support.
FastStone Image Viewer		Yes individual, linear	Yes; EXIF, JPEG comment	Yes many	Yes		Yes lossless transitions	Yes	full screen mode with all commands available via pop-up menu bars when approaching the mouse from the borders of the screen
Geeqie	Yes collections, keywords, filename, location, size, date, dimensions, comments, previous results	Yes block, linear, complex	Yes	Yes rotate, brightness, contrast	Yes	Yes			find duplicates, sort manager, recent collections
Gonvisor	No	Yes; Delete, rename	No	Yes	Yes	Yes	N/A	Yes, native	Made to easily read comics or manga can display two pages at time and view images in compressed ZIP, RAR, 7z, cbr, cba, cbz etc.
gThumb	Yes name, comment, date, category, folder, recursive-folder	Yes linear, block, complex	Partial	Yes manipulate color, flip/rotate, etc.	Yes		Yes		bookmarks, comments, rename series, create index image, create HTML album
Gwenview	Yes tags		Yes; Exif, IPTC, XMP	Yes; Rotate, Red eye removal, saturation, color balance, levels and more	Yes		Yes, rotation and flipping	Yes	batch processing, export to Internet/social media/HTML
IrfanView & Thumbnails	Yes	Yes various options	Yes; EIF, IPTC, Comment	Yes many features	Yes many	Yes	Opens and saves jpg2000 and jpgls photo files	Yes, native	can search for and replace pixel of a certain color (with some latitude) and replace all with a given color of pixels
KPhotoAlbum	Yes keywords, comments, title, any field from Exif metadata	Yes linear, complex	Partial	Yes per KIPI plugins	Yes configurable				Quick-tagging using keyboard tokens
Phase One Media Pro	Yes name, date, rating, file size, and many more.	Yes individual, linear	Yes; EXIF, IPTC, and custom keywords	Yes; Rotate, Red eye removal, saturation, color balance, levels and more	Yes	Yes		Yes	Find duplicates, hierarchical keywords, distributable catalog with free Media Pro reader, offline browsing of images
Picasa	Yes name, date, rating, faces	Yes individual, linear	Partial; Keywords	Partial basic	Yes	Yes	Yes rotation only	Yes	collages, Geotagging, Search for Faces, find duplicates
Shotwell	No	Yes individual, linear, hide	Yes; Read IPTC, Exif, XMP	Yes; Exposure, Saturation, Tint, Shadows, Temperature, and more	Yes	No	No	Yes	Non-destructive editor, Auto Enhance Images, Duplicate, Upload, Favorite
STDU Viewer	No	No	No	No	Yes	No	No	Yes	
Windows Photo Viewer	No	No	Yes: Exif	Yes rotate, lossless JPEG rotate, annotate TIFF images	Yes		Yes rotate only	Yes	
XnView Classic and MP	Yes name, date, file size, image size, meta data, ...	Yes individual, linear	Yes; IPTC, Exif, JPEG comment	Yes many	Yes configurable	Yes; Custom monitor profile supported	Yes	Partial only in MP	Supports Adobe Photoshop Filter 8BF plugins
Xv	No	Partial individual, all	Partial view comments	Yes many	Yes				
Zoner Photo Studio	Yes name, date, file size, meta data	Yes individual, linear	Yes; IPTC, Exif, XMP, JPEG comment	Yes very many	Yes configurable	Yes	Yes	Yes	sign images, 16 bits per channel, GPS support, merge pictures to HDR, WIC codecs support
Program	search (criteria)	selection (styles)	metadata	adjust image (functions)	hotkeys	color management (ICC)	JPEG Lossless operations	Unicode support	other / special

== See also ==
- Comparison of raster graphics editors
- Image editing
- List of Image file formats

== Notes ==
- iPhoto is part of iLife, which includes a DVD authoring package (iDVD), a video editor (iMovie), a music player (iTunes), a multimedia web publisher (iWeb), and an audio-sequencing program (GarageBand).
- FastPictureViewer's DirectX hardware acceleration support depends on the actual video card installed and the amount of available video memory. The commercial version also supports previewing some camera RAW formats for which a WIC-enabled codec exists. Such RAW codecs are currently available from Canon, Nikon, Olympus, Pentax, Sony and for Adobe DNG.
- Many applications on Mac OS X use either the Core Image or QuickTime APIs for image support. This enables reading and writing to a variety of formats, including JPEG, JPEG 2000, Apple Icon Image format, TIFF, PNG, PDF, BMP and more.
- SView5 may also run on Linux/x86 and MacOS/x86 using Mono.
