= XCF (file format) =

File format

- Filename extension: .xcf
- Internet media type: image/x-xcf
- Magic number: gimp xcf
- Developed by: GIMP
- Initial release: 15 December 1997; 28 years ago
- Container for: Graphics
- Open format?: yes, but standard is ad hoc

XCF, short for eXperimental Computing Facility, is the native image format of the GIMP image-editing program. It saves all of the data the program handles related to the image, including, among others, each layer, the current selection, channels, transparency, paths and guides.

Prior to version 4 (GIMP 2.10.0, released on 2018-04-27), the saved image data are compressed only by a simple RLE algorithm, but GIMP supports compressed files, using gzip, bzip2, or xz. The compressed files can be opened as normal image files. Since version 4, the image data can be compressed by zlib instead.

The XCF file format is backward compatible (all versions of GIMP can open earlier versions' files) and in some cases, forward compatible. For example, GIMP 2.0 can save text in text layers while GIMP 1.2 cannot. Text layers saved in GIMP 2.0 will open as ordinary image layers in GIMP 1.2. However, XCF files containing layer groups, a feature introduced in GIMP 2.7, cannot be opened with GIMP 2.6.

Despite some use in other programs (see § Software support), the use of XCF as a data interchange format is not recommended by the developers of GIMP, since the format reflects GIMP's internal data structures and there may be minor format changes in future versions. Instead, a collaborative effort between the developers of GIMP and Krita is underway to design a standardised raster file format, modelled on the OpenDocument format, called OpenRaster, for future use in both applications, and likely in others also.

GIMP's Save dialog saves in the XCF format: starting with version 2.8, other formats with import/export support were moved to an Export dialog.

== Software support ==
A partial list of image viewers and conversion software.

Selected software with some support for XCF
application	XCF-capable?	notes
GIMP	default format	program for which the format was developed
Seashore	default format	lightweight native Mac OS X image editing program based on GIMP
CinePaint	default format, but nonstandard	fork of GIMP with support for 16-bit and 32-bit floating point channels, and 16-bit integer channels; the XCF file format used in CinePaint has diverged from the GIMP's native format, so XCF files created in GIMP cannot be opened in CinePaint, and vice versa
DBGallery	does not support colour indexing	displays multi-layer non-indexed images and allows indexing, searching and other photo database operation
ImageMagick	does not support colour indexing or multiple layers	has an XCF reader module that can read single-layer non-indexed images
Project Dogwaffle	see ImageMagick row	(including PD Pro, PD Particles and PD Artist) imports XCF files using the ImageMagick library
Krita	Yes	imports XCF files using the GraphicsMagick library
Kolourpaint	Yes	can read XCF files using KDE's image I/O library plugin, like any other KDE program
Gwenview	does not support colour indexing	can display multi-layer non-indexed images
Digikam	does not support colour indexing	can display multi-layer non-indexed images
Imagine	does not support colour indexing or multiple layers	can display single-layer non-indexed images
XnView	does not support colour indexing or multiple layers	can display single-layer non-indexed images
Inkscape	export only	added support for XCF export in the 0.44 release
IrfanView	requires plugin	can display multi-layer images (composite image and individual layers) with a plugin
Paint.NET	requires plugin	can load and save multi-layer .xcf/.xcfgz/.xcfbz2 images (via ImXCF.FileType plugin)
PhotoLine	import only	loads multi-layer images with layer masks and blend modes
Chasys Draw IES	Yes	can load and save multi-layer .xcf/.xcfgz/.xcfbz2 images (from version 3.71.02)
MediaWiki and thus Wikimedia Commons	does not support colour indexing or later versions	supports XCF files that are compatible with GIMP 2.6 or 2.8, and when the color mode is RGB or grayscale
Corel Photo-Paint	does not support layer mask or paths	can load multi-layer images, support some layer modes
Photopea	Yes	online image editor which can open XCF files and convert to other formats including Photoshop's PSD
SDL2_image	Yes	development library
