= Xv (software) =

Shareware image viewer for Unix-like systems

xv
- Original author: John Bradley
- Developers: Michael Adams (currently), third-party contributors
- Stable release: 6.2.0 / February 27, 2026; 7 months ago
- Operating system: Unix-like, VMS
- Type: Image viewer
- License: Shareware
- Website: xv.trilon.com
- Repository: github.com/jasper-software/xv

xv is a shareware program written by John Bradley to display and modify digital images under the X Window System.

While popular in the early 1990s ("XV is widely considered to be the preeminent image viewer for the X Window System"), no official releases have been made since December 1994. Bradley was unable to negotiate the LZW patent license necessary for encoding the then-popular GIF format. The patent has now expired, so this legal constraint is no longer relevant.

Until at least 2000, Bradley collected third-party updates to xv, for example, support for the PNG image format. These were published as source code patches only.

xv can be run from the command line and offers a graphical interface.

xv can be used also for image manipulation (cropping or stretching of images and other effects), supports various image file formats (including among others Sun Raster, or Targa) and allows export to PostScript.

It distinguishes itself from many other bitmap viewing and editing programs with a very efficient interface in which the user edits just the parameters of a fixed pipeline of processing steps, rather than modifying the bitmap directly in each operation. As a result, the user can easily undo operations (such as cropping, color modifications, filtering) out of order, rather than only being able to undo the respective last operation. While this concept limits what xv can do compared to some alternatives, the functionality it provides can be applied very conveniently and efficiently.

== See also ==
- Comparison of image viewers
