= FastStone Image Viewer =

Image viewer software for Windows

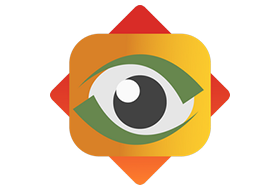

- FastStone Image Viewer
- Developer: FastStone Soft
- Release: 9 October 2004; 21 years ago
- Stable release: 8.5 / 24 June 2026; 39 days ago
- Written in: Delphi
- Operating system: Windows XP/Vista/7/8/10/11
- Size: 7 MB
- Available in: 20 languages
- List of languages English, Bulgarian, Simplified and Traditional Chinese, Czech, Danish, Dutch, Finnish, French, German, Hungarian, Italian, Korean, Bokmål Norwegian, Polish, Portuguese, Russian, Spanish, Swedish, Ukrainian
- Type: Image viewer and editor
- License: Proprietary, free for non-commercial use
- Website: www.faststone.org

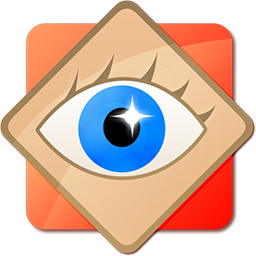
Original logo of the software

FastStone Image Viewer is an image viewer and organizer software for Microsoft Windows, provided free of charge for personal and educational use. The program also includes basic image editing tools, like cropping, color adjustment and red-eye removal.

Developed by FastStone, it was first released in 2004 and new stable versions have been released regularly since. It is available as an executable installer, zip, and a portable zip version.

== Features ==
- Thumbnail viewer (using Lanczos resampling algorithm)
- Crop Board and Draw Board
- Resizing, cropping, color correction, red-eye removal, clone brush, curve (tonality), levels, and unsharp mask
- Side-by-side image comparison
- Resampling
- Magnifier lens
- Batch operations including rename and convert
- Color space management
- Slide show, including music and transition effects
- Memory card image retriever
- Displays Exif camera metadata
- Support for BMP, JPEG, JPEG 2000, animated GIF, PNG, PCX, TIFF, WMF, ICO, and TGA - including raw formats like Canon's CR2 or Sony's ARW

== Reception ==
Upon release, the software site SnapFiles rated it five stars out of five. It also received five stars by the editor of Download.com. A PCWorld magazine review of version 4.0 of FastStone Image Viewer in 2011 noted the software's "lightning-fast" display of pictures. The reviewer felt that one of its greatest advantages was its "wide variety of file formats" the software supports. Rick Broida of CNET wrote in 2015 about version 5.4: "This freeware gem remains an essential download for anyone looking to view, edit and organize their photos." Broida thought that it was a "bit more robust" compared to IrfanView.

== See also ==
- Comparison of image viewers
- IrfanView
- XnView
