= Gonvisor =

Software viewer for comics and images

GonVisor
- Developer: GAA
- Stable release: 2.82 / November 2023; 2 years ago
- Operating system: Microsoft Windows
- Size: 5.9 MB
- Type: Image viewer
- License: Freeware
- Website: www.gonvisor.com

GonVisor is a freeware sequential image viewer utility for Microsoft Windows used mainly to view digital images in the style of a comic book, manga or magazine. It has some additional features to create and manage archives and also to enhance the images.

Although the software is created for Windows systems, it is possible for it to run on UNIX-like systems (Linux/Solaris/MacOS) using Wine.

== Features ==
- Open Comic Book Archive files, directories with images and standard images.
- Create Comic Book Archive files, a description file and a password can be added.
- Adjust automatically image to the screen size.
- Full-screen mode.
- Image transition effects.
- Reduce automatically margins.
- Enhange images adjusting different parameters to correct bad scanned images.
- Page through the images sequentially and scroll around pages with single key presses or mouse buttons.
- Display one or two pages at one time.
- Extraction of the images contained in a comic book archive.
- Bookmarks.
- Customizable hotkeys and mouse functions.
- Rating and management of comic book archives.
- Print images adjusting the image size.
- Bulk rename of image files.
- Music player control (Spotify, Winamp, Windows Media Player).
- Boss key to camouflage its window quickly.
- Multilanguage: Available in English, French, Spanish, Portuguese, Italian, German, Czech, Serbian and Dutch.

== Files ==
GonVisor supports all major image formats, comic book reader files such as .cbr, .cbz, .cb7 or .cba files, and compressed files containing images. These formats were made popular by CDisplay, but is now used by many other programs designed for reading comics. GonVisor also supports standard image formats (JPEG, PNG, BMP..), directories of images and the Adobe PDF format.

== See also ==
- Comparison of image viewers
