= FSIV =

FSIV may refer to:

- FastStone Image Viewer
- Fast Supply Intervention Vessel, a type of platform supply vessel
