= GThumb =

Image viewer and browser utility for the GNOME environment

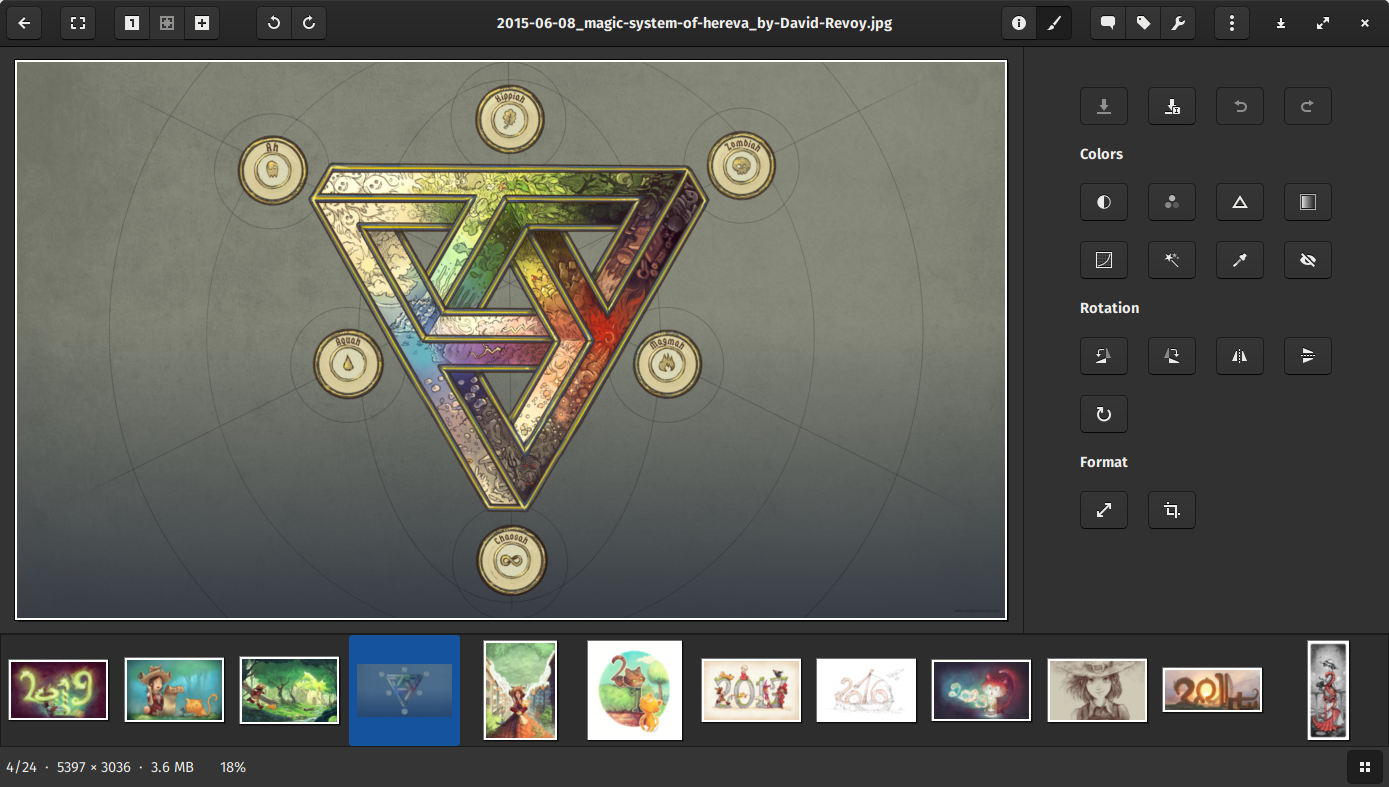
- gThumb v3.8.0 in EDIT mode
- Original author: Paolo Bacchilega
- Developer: The GNOME Project
- Release: 2001; 25 years ago
- Stable release: 4.0 / 28 September 2026; 42 days ago
- Written in: C (GTK)
- Operating system: Unix-like
- Type: Image viewer; Image organizer; Post-production tool
- License: GPL-2.0-or-later
- Website: wiki.gnome.org/Apps/Gthumb
- Repository: gitlab.gnome.org/GNOME/gthumb.git

GNOME Thumbails, formerly and internally known as gThumb, is a free and open-source image viewer and image organizer with options to edit images. It is designed to have a clean and simple user interface and follows the GNOME Human Interface Guidelines and integrates well with the GNOME desktop environment.

== Features ==
gThumb allows the filesystem to be browsed for images. They can be organized into catalogs, or viewed as a slideshow. Folders and catalogs can be bookmarked, and comments can be added to images.

Via gPhoto it can also acquire data directly from digital cameras.

gThumb offers a certain range of image editing operations suited for digital photography, such as the change of image hue, saturation, lightness, contrast or the adjustment of colors and sharpness. It can also crop, scale and rotate images by 90° or custom angles, and it features a red-eye effect removal function. Manipulated images can be saved in the formats JPEG, PNG, TIFF, .tga, avif, heif and WebP.

gThumb can export web-based photograph albums with various theme templates. These albums can be uploaded to a website, providing a very simple mechanism for publishing collections of photos on the web.

gThumb also includes many basic features such as copying, moving, deleting or duplicating images, printing, zooming, format transcoding, and batch renaming. It can read and write Exif, XMP, IPTC metadata.

gThumb provides a system of extensions (or plug-ins) to allow users to extend the functionality of gThumb, and it has the ability to call external scripts created in any language.

=== Dependencies ===
gThumb 4.0 requires glib, gtk, libpng, zlib, libjpeg, exiv2, lcms2, gstreamer, gstreamer-plugins-base, gstreamer-video, gsettings-desktop-schemas. Libraries that are not mandatory but possible include, LibTIFF, LibRaw, librsvg, libwebp, JPEG XL's libjxl, libheif, libgif, and colord.

== History ==
The first public version was 0.2 in 2001.

It was originally based on GQView. Starting from version 2.12.0 gThumb allows users to export images to various websites. Version 3.0.0 is based on GTK version 3, and supports high quality SVG zoom.

In September 2026 version 4.0 released. In this version the application is ported to GTK 4/Libadwaita. The final release of 4.0 saw gThumb officially renamed to GNOME Thumbnails to follow the modern naming convention for GNOME applications.

== Gallery ==
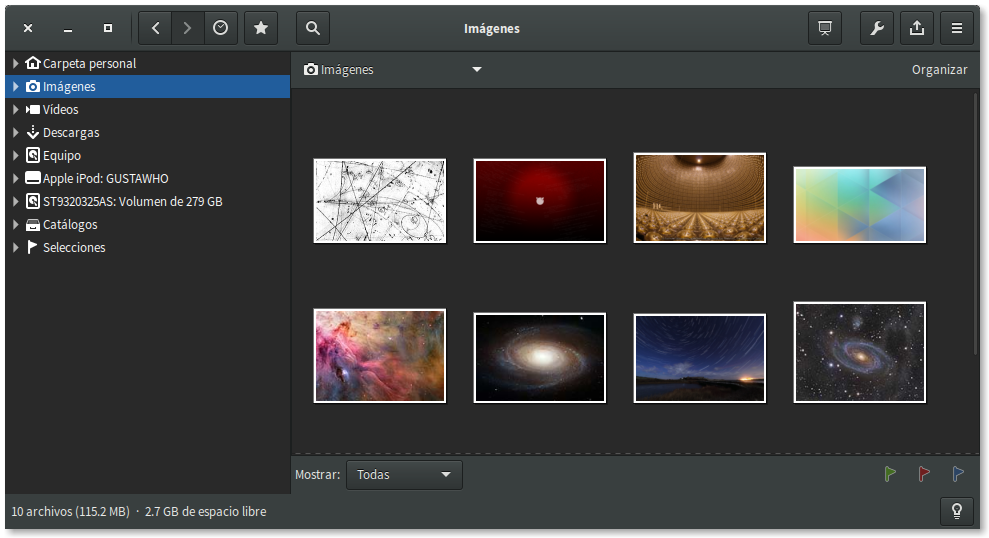
gThumb v3.4.0

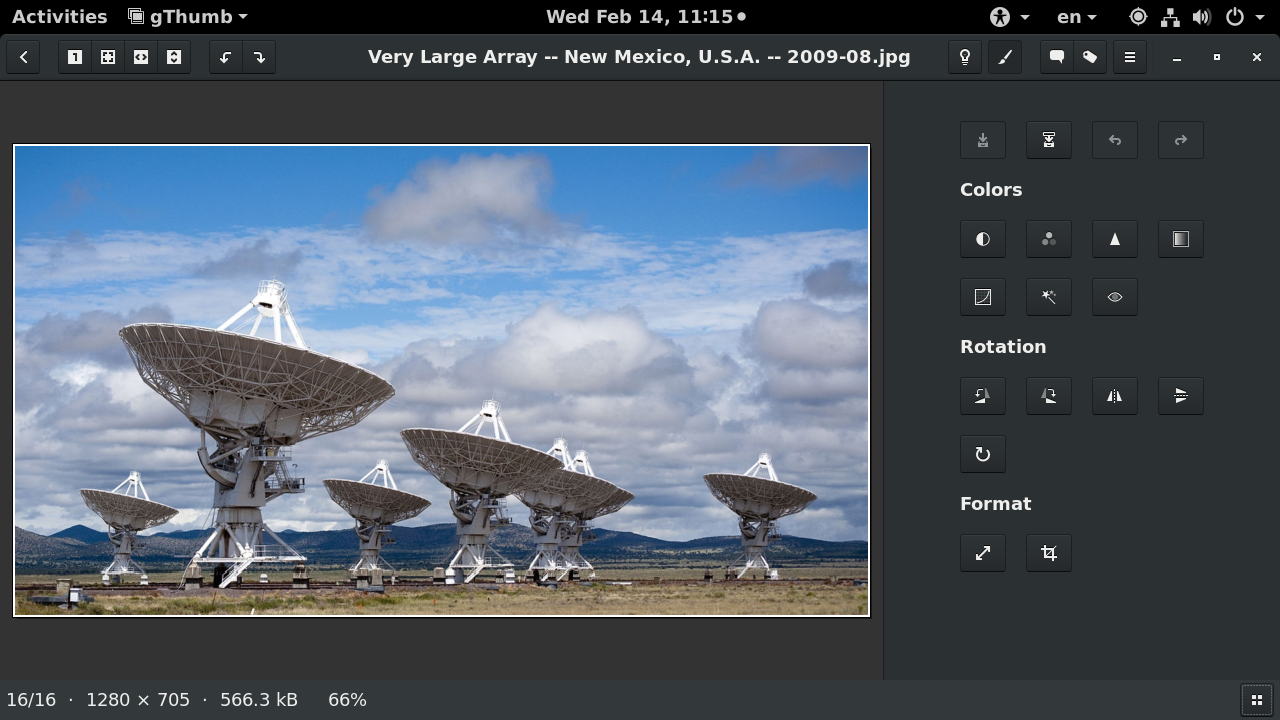
gThumb v3.4--Edit mode

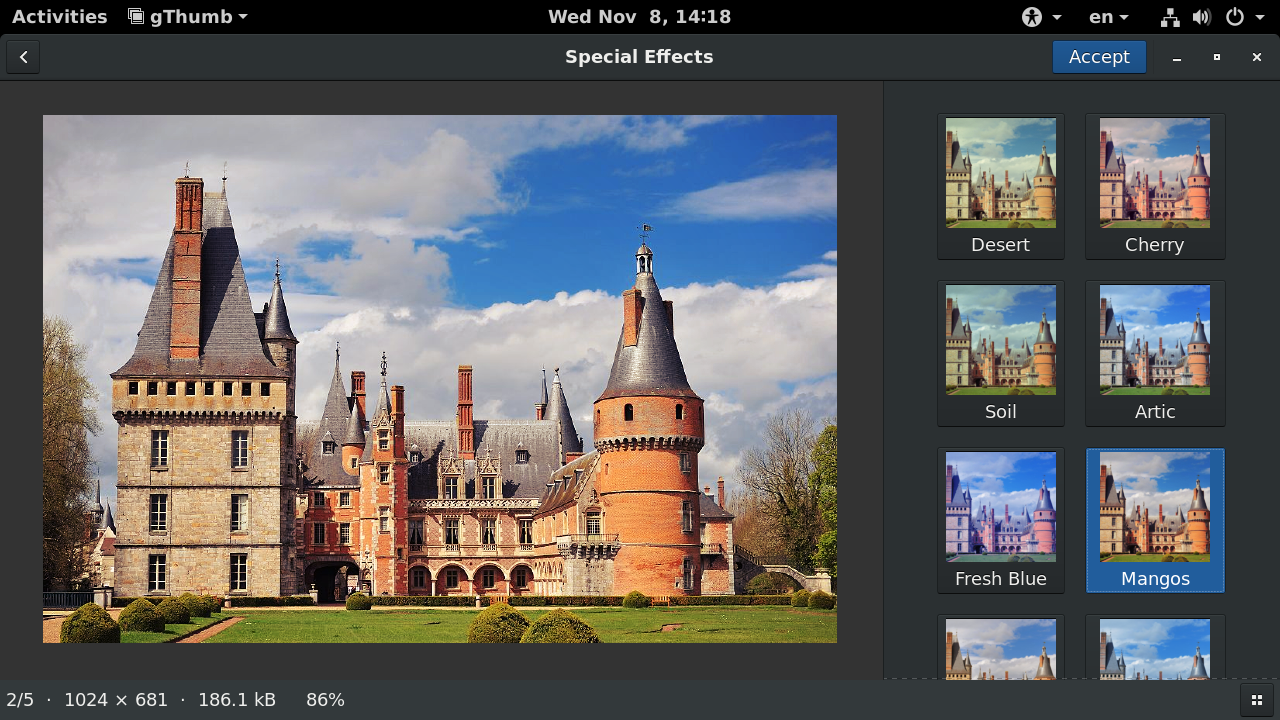
gThumb v3.4--Special effects

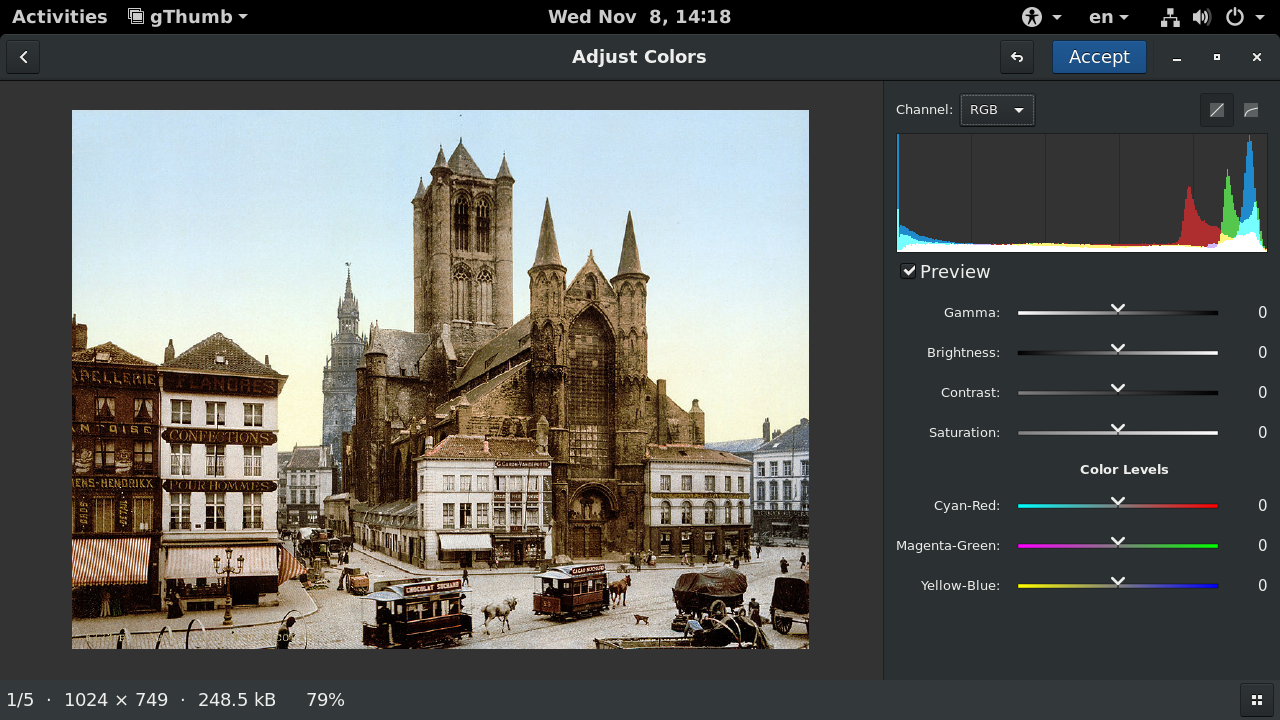
gThumb v3.4--Adjust Colors

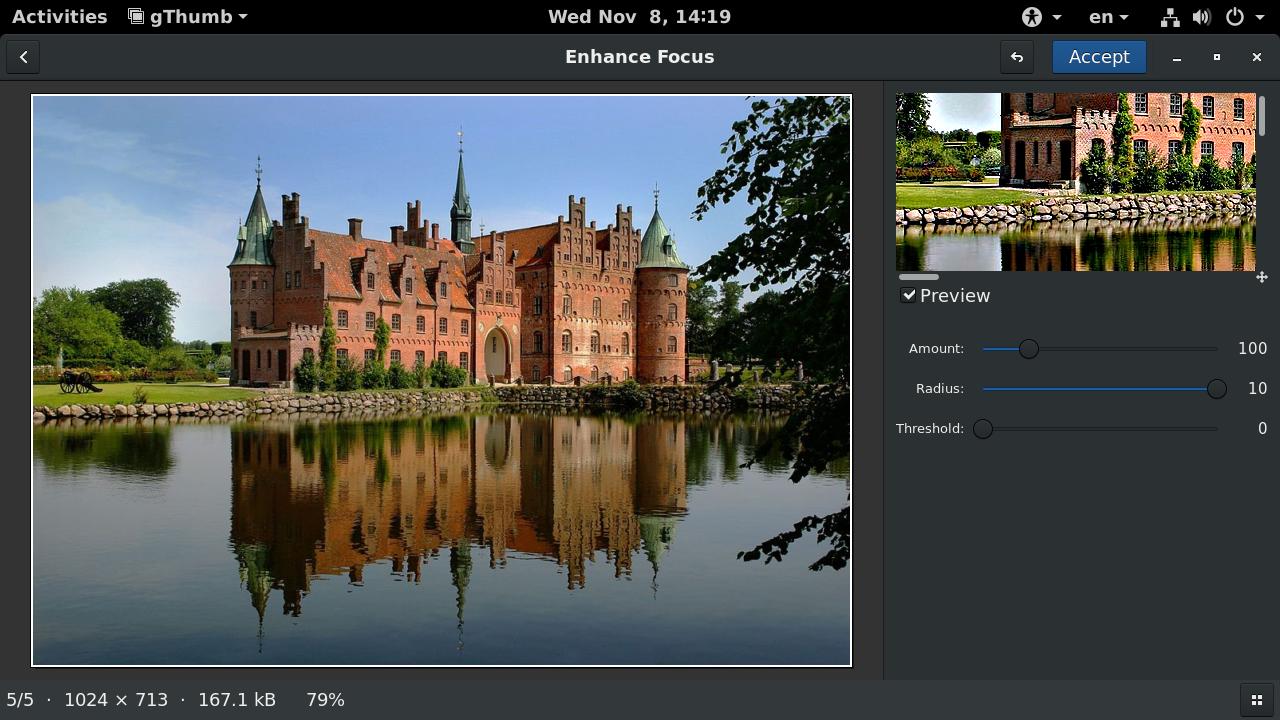
gThumb v3.4--Adjust sharpness

== See also ==
- Comparison of image viewers
- Eye of GNOME
- Darktable
- digiKam
