= FastPictureViewer =

Freemium image viewer for Windows

- Developer: Axel Rietschin Software Developments
- Release: January 15, 2008; 18 years ago
- Stable release: 1.95.400.0 / September 15, 2021; 4 years ago
- Written in: C++
- Operating system: Windows XP and later Windows Server 2003 and later
- Platform: IA-32 and x64
- Available in: English, Brazilian Portuguese, Chinese, Dutch, French, German, Hungarian, Italian, Japanese, Korean, Polish, Romanian, Russian, Slovenian, Spanish
- Type: Image viewer
- License: Freemium
- Website: www.fastpictureviewer.com

FastPictureViewer is a freemium image viewer for Windows XP and later. Its aim is to facilitate quick review, rating and annotation of large quantities of digital images in the early steps of the digital workflow, with an emphasis on simplicity and speed. As an app with a freemium license, a basic version is available cost-free for personal, non-profit or educational uses, while a commercial license is required for the professional version with additional features. The basic version starts as a full version trial.

== Features ==
FastPictureViewer is optimized for full-screen, borderless preview of digital images. It covers a limited number of scenarios, such as for example the initial pre-selection and rating of a relatively small number of images from a large set of potentially thousands ("culling"). The program has no image editing or image enhancement features and does not create and maintain a thumbnail database (it uses the system-provided thumbnail cache on Windows Vista or later), on the other hand it can browse deeply nested folder/subfolder trees containing many thousand images quickly and in a simple manner; the user interface is kept to the strict minimum and the program relies heavily on keyboard shortcuts. The software has been dubbed "the Porsche of image viewers" and described as "unbeatably fast" by German magazine c't Magazin für Computertechnik (the program also appeared in the magazine's software collection and in a subsequent article on Adobe DNG raw workflow software roundup).

According to the publisher the program features full color management, including support for custom-profiled wide-gamut monitors and ICCv2 and ICCv4 profile formats. Image rating is supported using industry-standard conventions (Adobe XMP), along with image pre-loading and caching if computer resources allows (the 64-bit edition of the program takes advantage of the memory that can be present beyond the 4GB boundary). The program can make use of multi-core CPUs for parallel image loading. It uses DirectX hardware acceleration when available to accelerate zooming and panning, black & white preview and lost shadows / lost highlights views, and can also downsize very large images (e.g. astronomic pictures) to make them fit in video memory or computer RAM if necessary. The software also features an IPTC metadata editor letting users annotate pictures (add or edit headline, caption, keywords, author and copyright information) in a way that is compatible with established industry standards.

New images can be added to the browsed folder(s) and the program catches them on the fly, allowing continued browsing without the need to exit and reload the folder(s), while a tracking mode can automatically displays that last image added to the folder tree, useful when photographing in tethered mode or with a Wi-Fi enabled camera that transfers images to a computer using PTP or FTP, so images can be displayed as they are shot. An automatic advance mode (simple slide show) is also provided, along with a navigation slider that can be used to jump to different places in the current image list (under Windows Vista or later, the navigation slider displays a thumbnail image picturing the target location; a thumbnail strip is also displayed at the top of the program's window).

The program supports the Unicode international character set (so it can browse images and folders whose names are written in any language) and features a multi-lingual user-interface. It integrates with the Windows shell, for example for context menus and AutoPlay events. It provides a simple external program launcher and a file copy function that copies (or moves) the image currently displayed to a pre-set folder, by pressing a hotkey, along with a file renaming function. Real-time RGB histogram and Exif information (shutter speed, F-stop, ISO speed, exposure compensation, ...) can be displayed in floating windows. The program adapts to screen resolution and supports large fonts and high-DPI display modes, as well as relatively low resolution Netbooks and sub-notebooks screens. The program integrates with the Windows 7 and 8.x taskbars and exposes a list of recently used folders through a mechanism known as "jump lists", introduced in Windows 7.

An entry-level version of the program is available free of charge for home, non-commercial use. This free version supports the JPEG and Microsoft HD Photo / JPEG-XR image formats and can read/write Adobe XMP rating metadata in external sidecar files (*.xmp) or embed it within JPEG (JFIF), HD Photo and TIFF containers.

FastPictureViewer is extensible via COM-based plug-ins, whose specifications are available from the software publisher upon request. The software adopts the user's language automatically (currently available for Brazilian/Portuguese, Simplified and Traditional Chinese, Dutch, English, French, German, Hungarian, Italian, Japanese, Korean, Polish, Romanian, Russian, Slovenian, Spanish).

In addition to the core functionality of the cost-free version, the commercial version is said by its publisher to have exclusive features, such as:

- Support for web and Windows image formats such as PNG and GIF with transparency, BMP, and ICO.
- Support for TIFF, MTIFF (multi-page TIFF), CMYK TIFF, TGA and DjVu.
- RAW formats previewing with color-management.
- Support for persistent bookmarks working across viewing sessions.
- Support for multi-cameras tethered shooting (MTP/PTP over USB 2.0 or WI-FI).
- Ability to configure more than one external tool in the program launcher.
- Ability to create and use preset renaming templates.
- Batch file mark/delete function.
- Batch file management functions (copy, move, delete, save-for-web) through a multi-function rule-based plug-in.
- Batch IPTC metadata editing (apply headline, caption, keywords, author and copyright information to a set of images).
- Batch Web publishing and local export (publish photos to photo-sharing websites or to a local drive or USB storage device).
- "Geo-clustering" (group images into folders according to their spatial or temporal proximity).
- Support for Controlled Vocabularies with assisted keyword entry in the IPTC Editor.
- Support for Reverse Geocoding in the IPTC Editor allowing users to fill the IPTC Location information from geotagged images.

=== Color management ===
By default the program uses the ICM 2.0 color engine (based on LinoColorCMM from Heidelberger Druckmaschinen AG) built into the Windows operating system since Windows 98. Users of the registered commercial version have the option to use the new WCS 1.0 color engine available on Windows Vista and later operating systems, instead of the default engine. This new color engine is based on Canon's Kyuanos technology and is said to use greater than 16-bit per channel floating point arithmetics for better gamut-mapping models that are meant to provide superior color space conversions than ICC rendering intents. FastPictureViewer Professional can optionally use the new high precision color engine available in modern versions of Windows, for potentially more accurate color viewing on profiled display monitors.

=== Batch processing ===
Batch file processing is provided in the registered edition through a plug-in extension dubbed File Utilities which provides rule-based point-and-click file management. Files can be selected from a number of parameters including Exif data, GPS position, speed, heading or altitude, file type, size, orientation, XMP rating, or dates. Actions can be performed on the selected files includes batch renaming, copy, move, delete, set rating, export to JPEG, send to FTP server.

=== Batch metadata editing ===
An IPTC metadata editor plug-in is provided with search-as-you-type dictionary-assisted keyword entry and GPS reverse-geocoding. All IPTC Core fields are implemented and the data can be embedded within standard image formats (JPEG, TIFF) either as IIM or IPTC4XMP, as well as written to industry-standard Adobe XMP sidecar files.

=== Publishing ===
The web publishing subsystem included in the registered edition allow users to upload photos directly to photo-sharing websites such as SmugMug, Zenfolio, PhotoShelter or a local hard disk or USB drive. The publishing function is able to perform on-the-fly format conversions to JPEG when necessary (so it can seamlessly publish RAW, TIFF and CGI files such as OpenEXR, DDS etc. to websites that normally don't support these formats), as well as automatic color-space conversion to sRGB for consistent color viewing across web browsers and devices.

Users can control the type of metadata included in published JPEG files: Exif, XMP, IPTC, GPS and copyright information can be enabled or disabled individually. Files can optionally be recompressed on-the-fly to optimize the upload size, or scaled-down to a specified dimension for screen viewing or printing at a given size.

The publishing system can upload files to multiple web sites simultaneously, each with their own parameters and settings: it is for example possible to upload original files to a site and downscaled copies to another web site at the same time. Site-specific functionality, such as for example SmugMug's SmugVault storage facility, are fully supported.

=== Smart auto-grouping ===
The Smart Auto-Grouping plug-in clusters images into folders according to their spatial or temporal proximity. Assuming the images are timestamped (e.g. contains a Date Taken Exif tag) the user can specify a time interval, for example one hour, and the geo-clustering plug-in will look at the currently viewed set of images and group together pictures taken within up to one hour from each others, forming "clusters" of "nearby" images. Similarly, images containing Exif GPS location information can be grouped together according to a user-specified distance criteria. This feature does not requires a reference point (i.e. it does not "search" for images taken near a given time or near a given location) but instead looks at the time taken or location of all images together, then finds groups matching the user-defined proximity criteria automatically.

== Formats support ==
The program installs a set of WIC-enabled image decoders providing access to RAW formats from more than 400 digital camera models, Rawzor compressed Raw images, and DNG. The bundled raw image decoders also extends the Windows operating system by providing thumbnail views, metadata search integration and full viewing to Windows Explorer, Photo Viewer, Photo Gallery and, on Windows 7 or later, Windows Media Center.

In addition to the built-in support for standard raster image formats such as JPEG, JPEG-XR and, in the licensed edition, TIFF, PNG, BMP and GIF, support for specialists image formats such as Photoshop PSD, OpenEXR, Radiance HDR, DirectX DDS, Softimage PIC, Autodesk Maya IFF, Silicon Graphics SGI, Netpbm PNM, PPM, PBM, PGM and JPEG2000, as well as 2D previewing support for Multi-Picture Object (MPO), Valve Texture Format (VTF) and JPEG Stereo (JPS) files can be added through the installation of separate image decoders.

FastPictureViewer image codecs are also available as a separate product called the FastPictureViewer Codec Pack, which is referenced on the Microsoft Photography codecs download page as well as on well-known technology websites. The codec pack enables read-only support for 40+ image formats in Windows Explorer, Photo Viewer, Photo Gallery and, on Windows 7 or later, Windows Media Center, as well as a number of codec-enabled applications, such as Sony Creative Software Vegas Pro, the IMatch digital asset management suite and more generally all applications compatible with Windows Imaging Component (WIC) codecs, which includes .NET Framework 3.x/4.x and Windows Presentation Foundation applications.

== Versions ==
The first public version was released on January 15, 2008.

This Windows program is provided as a in native 64-bit and 32-bit flavors. Runs on Windows XP SP3 (with some functionality restrictions), Windows Vista and later. Windows XP SP2 users may have to download and install the Windows Imaging Component (WIC) from the Microsoft website separately in order to run the program. Windows versions prior to XP SP2 are not supported.

FastPictureViewer used to be actively developed and was updated frequently: more than 300 updates as of mid-2013, including 9 major releases were published since the launch, averaging approximately one update per week. From 2017 to 2021 no updates were released, but in 2021 a technical refresh for 64-bit CPUs with AVX instructions was made available. 32-bit support has been dropped.

== Criticism ==
The software was repeatedly reported to use null-terminated registry keys that break other installed software and remain in the registry after deinstallation . These keys have to be removed with extra tools like RegDelNull.

== See also ==
- Image Viewers
- Digital Photography
- Comparison of Image Viewers
- Color Management and ICC Profiles
- Windows Imaging Component (WIC)
- Extensible Metadata Platform (XMP)
- Media Transfer Protocol (MTP/PTP)
- International Press Telecommunications Council (IPTC)
- An example of a very large image: the Orion nebula (18,000 x 18,000 pixels)
