= Image organizer =

Software for organizing digital images

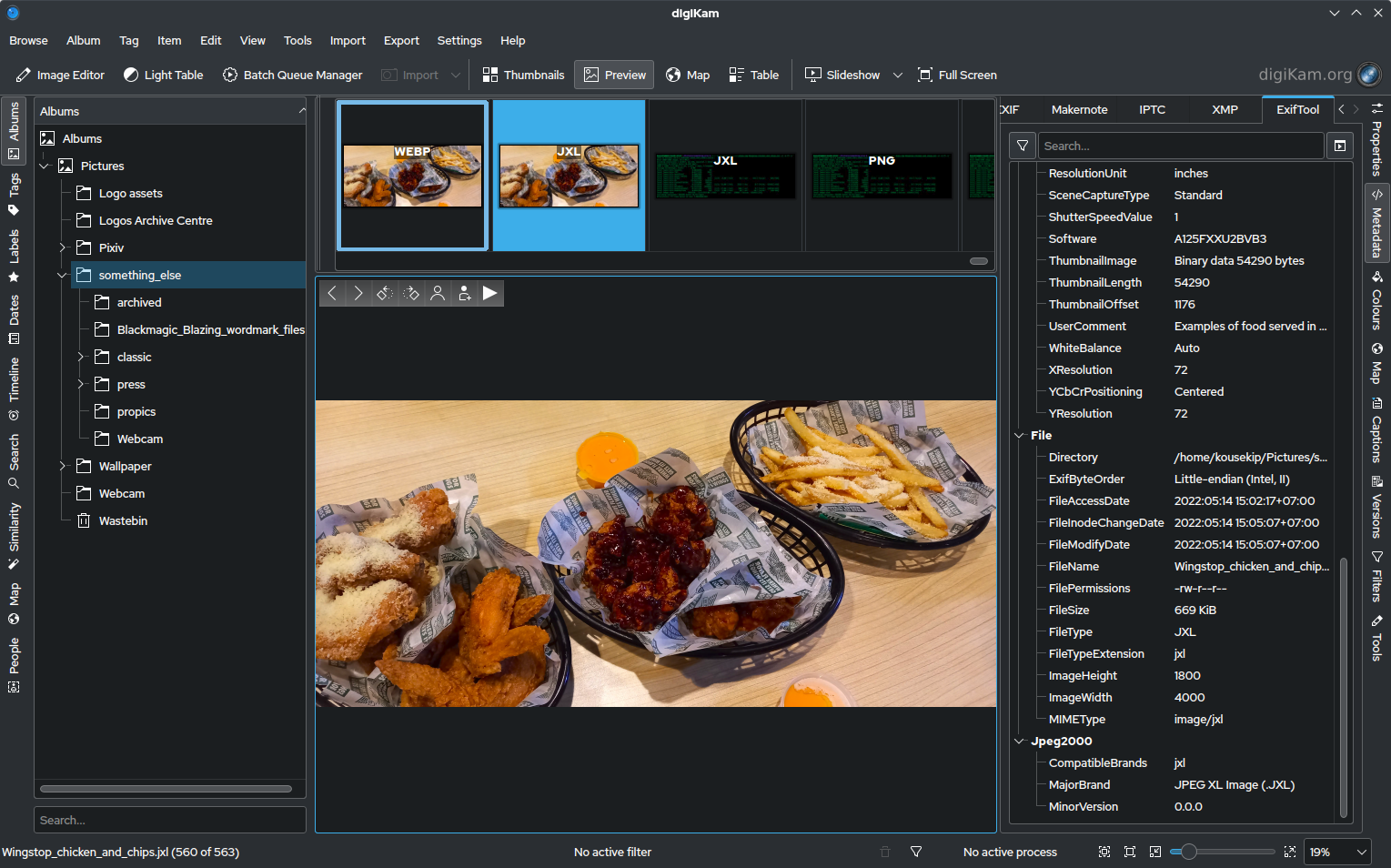
DigiKam, an image organizer

An image organizer or image management application is application software for organizing digital images. It is a kind of desktop organizer software application.

Image organizer software focuses on handling large numbers of images. In contrast to an image viewer, an image organizer can edit image tags and can often upload files to on-line hosting pages. Enterprises may use Digital Asset Management (DAM) solutions to manage larger and broader amounts of digital media.

Some programs that come with desktop environments, such as gThumb (GNOME) and digiKam (KDE) were originally simple image viewers, and have evolved into image organizers.

== Common image organizers features ==
- Multiple thumbnail previews are viewable on a single screen and printable on a single page. (Contact Sheet)
- Images can be organized into albums
- Albums can be organized into collections
- User roles and permissions enable controlled access to certain images while preventing access to others.
- Adding tags (also known as keywords, categories, labels or flags). Tags can be stored externally, or in industry-standard IPTC or XMP headers inside each image file or in sidecar files.
- Share: Resizing, exporting, e-mailing and printing.

== Not so common, or differentiating features ==
- Pictures can be organized by one or more mechanisms
  - Images can be organized into folders, which may correspond to file-system folders.
  - Images may be organized into albums, which may be distinct from folders or file-system folders.
  - Albums may be organized into collections, which may not be the same as a folder hierarchy.
  - Grouping or sorting by date, location, and special photographic metadata such as exposure or f-stops if that information is available. See Exif for example.
  - Images can appear in more than one album
  - Albums can appear in more than one collection
  - Grouped or stacking of images within an album, by date, time, and linking copies to originals.
  - Adding and editing titles and captions
- Simple or sophisticated search engines to find photos
  - Searching by keywords, caption text, metadata, dates, location or title
  - Searching with logical operators and fields, such as "(Title contains birthday) and (keywords contain cake) not (date before 2007)"
- Separate backing up and exporting of metadata associated with photos.
- Retouching of images (either destructively or non-destructively)
- Editing images in third-party graphical software and then re-incorporating them into the album automatically
- Stitching to knit together panoramic or tiled photos
- Grouping of images to form a slideshow view
- Exporting of slideshows as HTML or Flash presentations for web deployment
- Synchronizing of albums with web-based counterparts, either third-party (such as Flickr), or application specific (such as Lightroom or Phase One Media Pro).
- Retention of Exif, IPTC and XMP metadata already embedded in the image file itself

== Two categories of image organizers ==
- Automatic image organizers. These are software packages that read data present in digital pictures and use this data to automatically create an organization structure. Each digital picture contains information about the date when the picture was taken. It is this piece of information that serves as the basis for automatic picture organization. The user usually has little or no control over the automatically created organization structure. Some tools create this structure on the hard drive (physical structure), while other tools create a virtual structure (it exists only within the tool).
- Manual image organizers. This kind of software provides a direct view of the folders present on a user's hard disk. Sometimes referred to as image viewers, they allow the user only to see the pictures but do not provide any automatic organization features. They give maximum flexibility to a user and show exactly what the user has created on their hard drive. While they provide maximum flexibility, manual organizers rely on the user to have their own method to organize their pictures. Currently there are two main methods for organizing pictures manually: tag and folder based methods. While not mutually exclusive, these methods are different in purposes, procedures, and outcomes.

Many commercial image organizers offer both automatic and manual image organization features. A comparison of image viewers reveals that many free software packages are available that offer most of the organization features available in commercial software.

== Future of image organization ==
There are several imminent advances anticipated in the image organization domain which may soon allow widespread automatic assignment of keywords or image clustering based on image content:

- colour, shape and texture recognition (For example, Picasa experimentally allows searching for photos with primary colour names.)
- subject recognition
- fully or semi-automated facial, torso or body recognition (For example, FXPAL in Palo Alto experimentally extracts faces from images and measures the distance between each face and a template.)
- geo-temporal sorting and event clustering. Many software will sort by time or place; experimental software has been used to predict special events such as birthdays based on geo-temporal clustering.

In general, these methods either:

- automatically assign keywords based on content, or
- measure the distance between an untagged image and some template image which is associated with a keyword, and then propose that the operator apply the same keyword(s) to the untagged images

== Notable image organizers ==
Program	OS	Type	License	Metadata	Geotagging	Facial recognition	Map display	Synchronizes with online library	Notes
ACDSee	Windows		Proprietary	Yes IPTC Exif XMP	Yes	Yes		Yes ≤ 25 GB to ACDSee online, flickr, SmugMug, and Zenfolio	Supports: >100 file formats, Unicode, batch processing, viewing contents of archives formats, non-destructive editing, DB export, R/W to CD, VCD, DVD. Contains: SMTP email client, FTP transport, duplicate file finder.
Adobe Lightroom CC	Windows, macOS, iOS, Android and Web	cloud-based database	Proprietary	Yes	No	No		Yes	not compatible with Lightroom Classic CC
Adobe Lightroom Classic CC	Windows and macOS	catalogue-managed local folders	Proprietary	Yes IPTC Exif XMP	Yes	Yes		Yes Flickr, PicasaWeb, Piwigo, SmugMug with plugins	Professional image management application database, asynchronously catalog DVD collections of 10,000's of photos. Has built-in RAW Editor that allows to edit RAW images in batch
Adobe Photoshop Album	Windows and macOS		Proprietary	Yes		No		No	discontinued in 2007, superseded by Elements Organizer
Adobe Photoshop Elements Organizer	Windows and macOS		Proprietary	Yes Exif IPTC XMP	Yes	Yes		Yes Flickr, Vimeo, YouTube, Facebook, Twitter, Email	Component of Adobe Photoshop Elements. Also supports management and sharing of video clips.
Aperture	macOS	local database	Proprietary	Yes Exif IPTC XMP	Yes	Yes		Yes iCloud, Flickr, Facebook, SmugMug	discontinued in 2015, superseded by Photos (Apple)
CodedColor PhotoStudio Pro	Windows		Proprietary	Yes IPTC	No	No			
DBGallery	Windows	Cloud and On-premise	Proprietary	Yes IPTC Exif XMP	Yes	No	Yes	No	Team features such as version control and activity logging. Support for very large collections (millions). Accessed using web browsers.
digiKam	KDE (Linux, macOS, Windows)		GPL	Yes IPTC Exif XMP	Yes	Yes	Yes	Yes; 23hq, Facebook, Flickr, Gallery2, Piwigo, SmugMug	Image management application database, deals with collections of 100,000's of photos
Digital Photo Professional	Windows		Proprietary						
F-Spot	Linux		GPL	Yes					discontinued in 2017
FastStone Image Viewer	Windows		Freeware	Yes Exif					
Fotostation	Windows, macOS		Proprietary	Yes	No				
Geeqie	Linux		GPL	Yes	Yes	No	Yes	No	
Google Photos	iOS, Android and Web		Freeware	Yes IPTC	Yes	Yes	No	Yes	Integrated with Google online tool suite.
gThumb	Linux		GPL	Yes		No	Yes		
iPhoto	macOS	local database	Proprietary	Yes	Yes	Yes	Yes	Yes	discontinued in 2015, superseded by Photos (Apple)
KPhotoAlbum	Linux		GPL	Yes	Yes	No *	Yes	No	* Has an option to tag faces on photo manually
Phase One Media Pro	Windows and macOS		Proprietary	Yes IPTC Exif XMP	No	No		No	discontinued in 2018, superseded by Capture One
Photos (Apple)	macOS, iOS and Web	cloud-based database	Proprietary	Yes	No	Yes	Yes	Yes	Default photo manager for macOS, iOS, tvOS, watchOS. Supports editing, iCloud, printing, sharing, searching.
Photos (Windows)	Windows		Freeware		No	Yes	No	No	Default photo manager for Windows 8 and later.
PicaJet	Windows		Proprietary	Yes Exif IPTC XMP				Yes Flickr, Fotki	Multi-user database access, unlimited category-nesting levels, hiding private images, supports for more than 60 image file formats
Picasa	Windows, macOS and Linux		Freeware	Yes IPTC	Yes	Yes	Yes (per folder)	Yes PicasaWeb	discontinued in 2016, superseded by Google Photos
Shotwell	Linux		LGPL	Yes Exif IPTC XMP	No	No	No	Yes Facebook, Flickr, PicasaWeb, Piwigo	non-destructive editing, one-click autoenhance
Shutterfly Studio	Windows		Freeware	Yes					
ViewMinder	Windows		Proprietary						discontinued in 2007
Windows Photo Gallery	Windows		Proprietary	Yes IPTC Exif XMP	Yes	Yes		Yes OneDrive, Facebook, Flickr, Inkubook plus more with plugins	discontinued in 2017, superseded by Photos (Windows)
XnView	Windows, macOS and Linux	local database	Freeware	Yes IPTC Exif	Yes	Yes	Yes (per file)	Yes Imgur, ImageShack	
Zoner Photo Studio	Windows		Proprietary	Yes Exif IPTC XMP	Yes	No		Using HTML templates	
Program	OS	Type	License	Metadata	Geotagging	Facial recognition	Map display	Synchronizes with online library	Notes

== See also ==
- Image viewers
- Image retrieval
- Digital asset management
- Comparison of image viewers
- Desktop organizer
- Personal wiki
