= Geeqie =

Image viewer

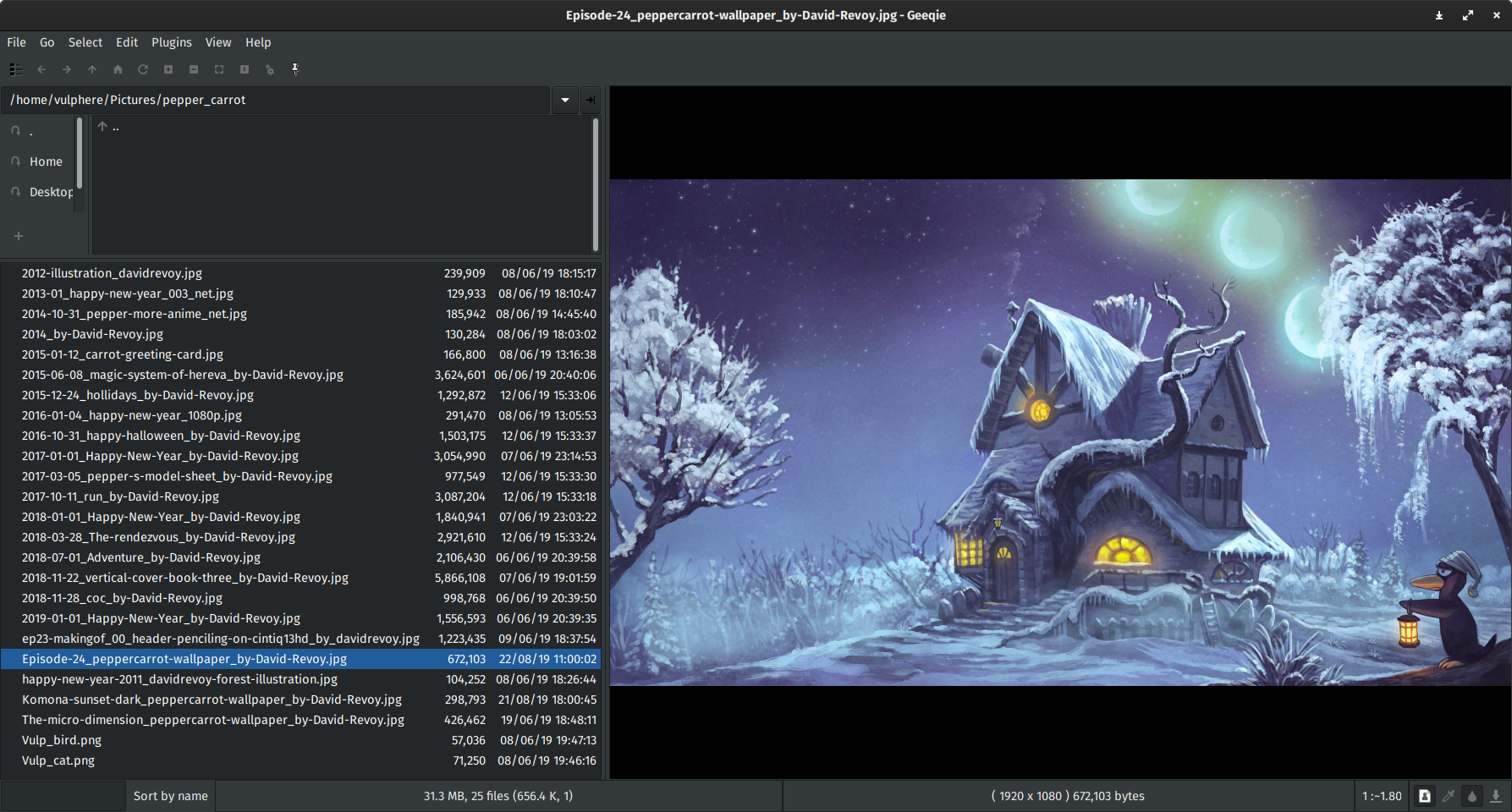
- Developer: The Geeqie community
- Stable release: 2.6.1 / 2 June 2025; 7 months ago
- Repository: geeqie.org/cgi-bin/gitweb.cgi?p=geeqie.git
- Written in: C
- Operating system: Unix-like
- Type: Image viewers
- License: GPL-2.0-or-later
- Website: www.geeqie.org

Geeqie is a free software image viewer and image organiser program for Unix-like operating systems, which includes Linux-based systems and Apple's OS X. It was first released in March 2010, having been created as a fork of GQview, which appeared to have ceased development. It uses the GTK toolkit. In September 2015, development was moved from SourceForge to GitHub.

== Features ==
- Viewing raster and vector images, in the following formats:

3FR ANI ARW AVIF BMP CR2 CR3 CRW CUR DDS DjVu DNG ERF FITS GIF HEIC HEIF ICO JP2/JPC/JPX/J2K/JPF JPE/JPEG/JPG JPS JPEGXL KDC MEF MOS MPO MRW NEF NPY NRW ORF (including OM-1) PBM/PGM/PNM/PPM PEF PNG PSD QIF/QTIF (QuickTime Image Format) SCR (ZX Spectrum) RAF RAW RW2 SR2 SRF SVG/SVGZ TGA/TARGA TIF/TIFF WEBP XBM XPM

- Images can be displayed singly in normal or fullscreen mode; static or slideshow mode; in sets of two or four per page for comparison; or as thumbnails of various sizes. Animated images are supported.
- All available metadata and Exif/IPTC/XMP data can be displayed, as well as colour histograms and assigned tags, keywords and comments
- Panels can be docked or floating
- Tags, both predefined and custom, can be assigned to images, and stored either as image metadata (where the file format allows), sidecar files, or in directory metadata files. Keywords and comments can also be assigned.
- Basic editing in the form of lossless 90/180-degree rotation and flipping is supported; external programs such as GIMP, Inkscape, and custom scripts using ImageMagick can be linked to allow further processing.
- Advanced searching is available using criteria such as filename, file size, age, image dimensions, similarity to a specified image, or by keywords or comments. If images have GPS coordinates embedded, you may also search for images within a radius of a geographical point.
- Geeqie supports applying the colour profile embedded in an image along with the system monitor profile (or a user-specified monitor profile)
- Geeqie sessions can be remotely controlled from external software, so it can be used as an image-viewer component of a bigger application.
- Geeqie includes a 'find duplicates' tool which can compare images using a variety of criteria (filename, file size, visual similarity, etc.), either within a single folder or between two folders.
- Images may be given a rating value (also known as a "star rating").
- Maps from http://www.openstreetmap.org may be displayed in a side panel. If an image has GPS coordinates embedded, its position will be displayed on the map - if Image Direction is encoded, that will be displayed also. If an image does not have embedded GPS coordinates, it may be dragged-and-dropped onto the map to encode its position.
- A more extensive list of features may be found here.

== Reception ==
Geeqie has been generally well received in the technical press. A 2012 review in Free Software Magazine said it is "highly recommended, if not best in class". A 2011 Linux Insider review awarded it 5 out of 5 stars. A 2010 Linux Magazine review called Geeqie an "indispensable tool", "lightning fast". A 2012 Libre Graphics World review noted that Geeqie seems to be "the only up-to-date JPS and MPO viewer on Linux right now". A negative review in 2010 from Tom's Hardware said it "doesn't offer much more than system default apps".

== GQview ==
GQview is the predecessor to Geeqie. It had been developed from 1998 to 2006 by John Ellis, the last release being in December 2006. Efforts to contact Ellis since then proved unsuccessful, so a group of interested developers forked the GQview code, adopted the name Geeqie, and set about enhancing it. In some Linux distributions (such as Debian and its derivatives), a gqview package was provided as a shortcut to Geeqie for easier upgrade.

== See also ==
- Comparison of image viewers
