= Interactive Digital Photomontage =

Interactive Digital Photomontage is GPL-licensed software for creating interactive digital photomontages.

It was jointly developed by University of Washington and Microsoft Research and based on a publication in ACM Transactions on Graphics in 2004.

== Overview ==
The software can extend depth-of-field, remove objects, stitch panoramas, and relight objects, among other features.

It is a cross-platform program developed with wxWidgets toolkit and uses publicly available but non-GPL graph cut software developed by Vladimir Kolmogorov at Microsoft.

== See also ==
- KPhotoAlbum
- Gallery Project
- Shotwell (software)
