= Gwenview =

Image viewer software for KDE

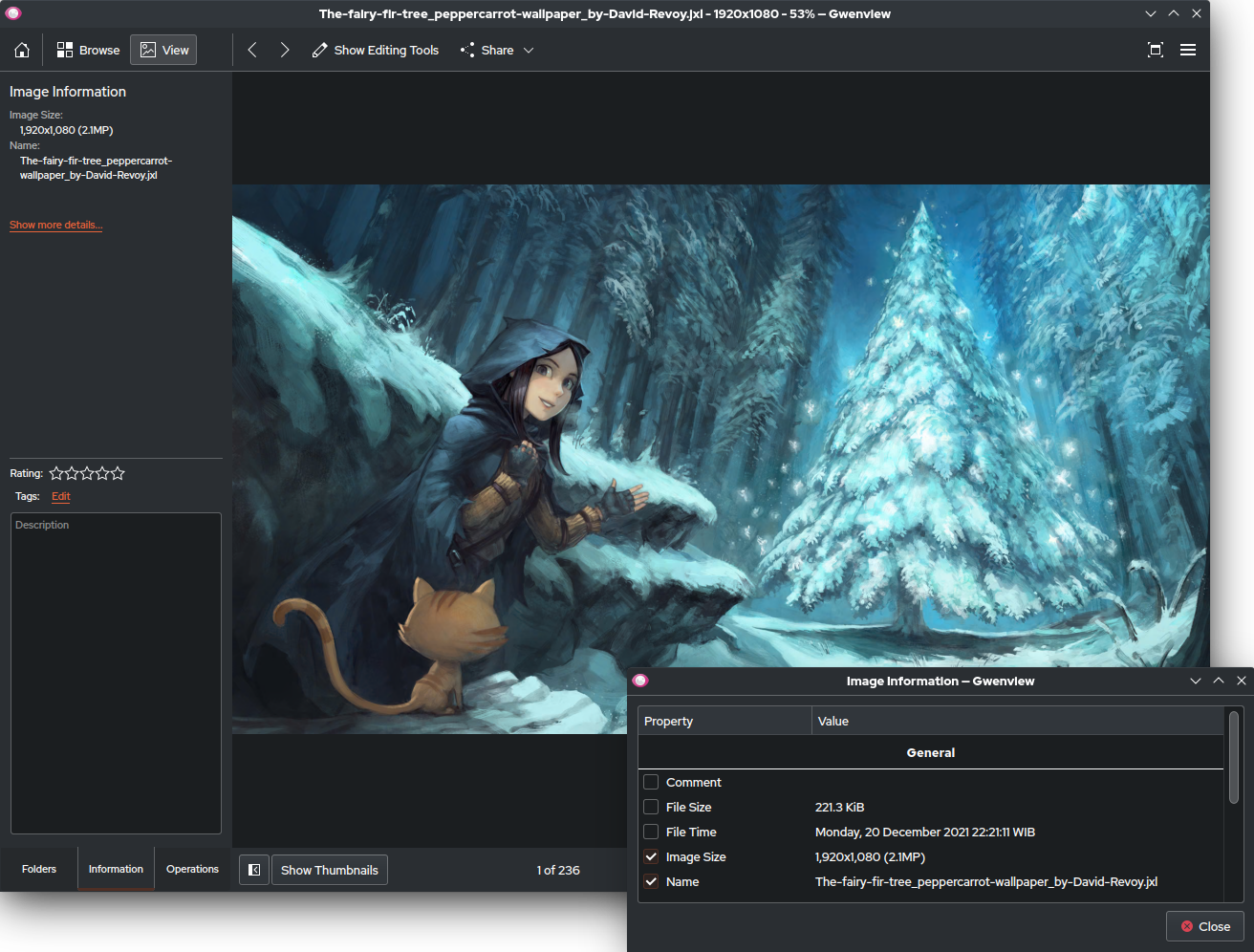
- Gwenview in KDE Gear 21.12.0
- Original author: Aurélien Gâteau
- Developer: KDE
- Stable release: 25.12.0 / 3 December 2025
- Written in: C++
- Platform: KDE Frameworks, Qt
- Type: Image viewer
- License: GPL-2.0-only or GPL-3.0-only
- Website: apps.kde.org/gwenview/
- Repository: invent.kde.org/graphics/gwenview

Gwenview is an image viewer for Unix-like systems (including Linux) and is released as part of the KDE Applications bundle. The current maintainer is Aurélien Gâteau. The word "Gwen" means "white" in the Breton language and is commonly used as a first name.

== History ==
Aurélien Gâteau started Gwenview using GTK but switched to Qt early in development. Gwenview was first available for K Desktop Environment 3. Later it was released as part of the KDE Software Compilation 4 with a simplified user interface, making it more suitable for quickly browsing through collection of images. It also provided a full-screen interface that can be used to display images as a slide-show. In 2014, Gwenview was ported to KDE Frameworks 5 and released as part of KDE Applications. As part of the KDE Gear, it was ported to Qt 6 and KDE Frameworks 6 in Gear 24.02

== Features ==
Major features include:

- Directory browser
- Raster image (including but not limited to BMP, PNG, JPEG, GIF, MNG, TIFF, and PSD), SVG, RAW (limited), and video support
- Easy to use interface
- Metadata comment editor
- Thumbnail image view of current directory
- Import images from external storage
- Use of KIPI (KDE Image Plugins Interface) plugins for manipulating images
- Filtering based on file type, file name pattern, and date
- Share images to social networking sites.

== See also ==
- Comparison of image viewers
- digiKam
- gThumb
