= Rawzor =

Image compression software

- Preview release: 0.47 beta / February 22, 2010; 15 years ago
- Operating system: Windows and Mac OS X
- Available in: English
- Website: www.rawzor.com

Rawzor is a proprietary lossless image compression software which compresses camera raw images without any loss in image quality or meta-information. It is available for Microsoft Windows and Mac OS X.

== Features ==
- Supports all major raw formats. Complete list of supported formats and cameras is on the website.
- Typically provides between 20% and 60% space savings depending upon the raw format. This is significantly better than compression obtained by zip or rar on image files.
- It is completely lossless, there is absolutely no loss in image quality or meta-information. Decompression gives back exactly the same original file.

== Working with Rawzor compressed images ==
Rawzor has released a free SDK using which many image processing software provide support to open and edit Rawzor compressed images. SDK is available for 32-bit and 64-bit Windows, Mac OS X and Linux.

Some of the software supporting Rawzor compressed .rwz images:

- Konvertor supports natively Rawzor compressed images.
- XnView provides plugin to support Rawzor compressed images.
- RawTherapee added Rawzor support starting version 2.4 on both Windows and Linux.
- ExifTool added Rawzor support in September 2008.
- Zoner Photo Studio supports Rawzor's compressed images starting with version 12.
- Manuel Llorens' fast precompiled dcraw binaries include Rawzor support.
- FastPictureViewer supports Rawzor compressed images since March 2010.
- FPV Codecs add support for showing preview and meta-data of Rawzor compressed images in Windows explorer.

Rawzor compressed photos have .rwz extension. For example, birthday.cr2 will after compression become birthday.cr2.rwz The naming convention also indicates that the original .cr2 file is preserved within the compressed .rwz file.

Rawzor compressed images can be decompressed to get back the image file in its original format.
