= CDisplay =

Comic book archive viewer

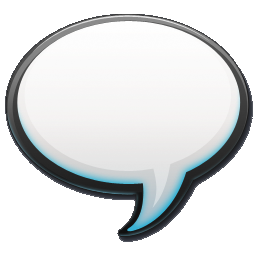
- The application icon
- Developer: David Ayton
- Final release: 1.8.1 / April 2004; 22 years ago
- Operating system: Microsoft Windows
- Type: Image viewer
- License: Freeware/abandonware
- Website: www.cdisplay.me (semi-official)

CDisplay is a freeware Comic book archive viewer and sequential image viewer utility for Microsoft Windows used to view images one at a time in the style of a comic book. It popularized the comic book archive file format. The program's creator, David Ayton, established the format by changing the file extensions of standard ZIP and RAR archives to .cbz and .cbr. This allowed CDisplay to create dedicated file associations, ensuring comic files opened natively in the viewer rather than being intercepted by standard file extraction utilities. CDisplay was written to easily view JPEG, PNG and static GIF format images sequentially. The program was designed to be less general purpose than existing image viewer programs, and more convenient for simply viewing images sequentially.

== Development ==
The program was compiled using Borland C++ Builder 5.0.

The source code was not made available, and the program ceased to be maintained when the author died in 2003. However, independent software developer Henri Gourvest was inspired to recreate the program as CDisplay Ex.

== See also ==
- Comparison of image viewers
