= KPhotoAlbum =

Image organizer

- Developers: Jesper K. Pedersen, Andreas Neustifter, Johannes Zarl-Zierl, Miika Turkia, Robert Krawitz, Tobias Leupold
- Stable release: 6.1.0 / 4 October 2025; 2 months ago
- Repository: invent.kde.org/graphics/kphotoalbum
- Operating system: Unix-like
- Type: Image organizer
- License: GPL-2.0-or-later
- Website: www.kphotoalbum.org

KPhotoAlbum (previously known as KimDaBa) is an image viewer and organizer for Unix-like systems created and maintained by Jesper K. Pedersen. The core philosophy behind its creation was that it should be easy for users to annotate images and videos taken with a digital camera. Users can search for images based on those annotations (also called categories) and use the results in a variety of ways. Features include slideshows, annotation, KIPI plugin support for manipulating images, and Boolean searches.

KPhotoAlbum is licensed under the GPL-2.0-or-later license.

== History ==
Jesper K. Pedersen created the project in December 2002 under the name KimDaBa (K image Data Base). The project was released on December 2, 2004. KimDaBa was renamed to KPhotoAlbum on May 9, 2006. Also on 2006, Google Summer of Code sponsored Tuomas Suutari to create a SQL database back-end for KPhotoAlbum, that although functional, wasn't ready to be included in version 3.0, released December 31. This version improved existing functionalities and added support for viewing video files. Version 4.0 supported KD4 and added "stacking" of images belonging together (like for HDR or panorama images).Version 4.6.0 included face detection.

== See also ==
- DigiKam
- Comparison of image viewers
- KDE Applications
- List of KDE applications
