= Timehop =

Smartphone app that reminds users of their past activity

- Company type: Private
- Industry: Technology
- Founded: 2011
- Founder: Jonathan Wegener; Benny Wong
- Headquarters: New York, NY, United States
- Area served: Worldwide
- Products: Apps
- Website: timehop.com

Timehop is an application for smartphones that collects old photos and posts from Facebook, Instagram, Twitter, Apple Photos, Google Photos and Dropbox photos and resurfaces them to the user on the same calendar day from previous years.

The company was founded in 2011 by Jonathan Wegener and Benny Wong. Timehop was acquired by Sincere Corporation in June 2023. As of March 2025, Timehop had over 20 million users.

== History ==
Timehop began as 4SquareAnd7YearsAgo, created at Foursquare’s Hackathon in February 2011. The original goal was to replay past Foursquare check-ins in real-time, which evolved into a daily email service.

Wegener and Wong later launched PastPosts.com and And7YearsAgram, before combining the services under the single brand Timehop.

In 2013, Timehop raised $3 million from Spark Capital to support the development of its Android version.

By 2014, the iOS version had surpassed one million downloads, the app was listed in the Top 200 in the U.S. App Store, and the company raised $10 million in Series B funding, led by Shasta Ventures.

In June 2023, Sincere Corporation acquired Timehop. Sincere is the parent company of Punchbowl, Lovebird, and Memento.

== Features ==
Timehop provides users with a range of memory-based features:

- Daily Memories: A feed showing content from the same date in previous years.
- Then & Now: Lets users compare old photos with new ones to visualise changes over time.
- Connected Services: Integrates with Facebook, Instagram, Twitter, Google Photos, Apple Photos, Dropbox, and more.
- Sharing Tools: Users can edit and share memories with captions, stickers, and frames.
- RetroVideo and News: Offers nostalgic content such as old commercials, viral videos, and historical events.

== Controversy ==
=== App redesign (2016) ===
In December 2016, Timehop launched version 4.0, which overhauled the user interface by replacing the scrolling timeline with a paginated layout and removed several popular features. The change was poorly received, resulting in over 7,000 one-star reviews on the iOS App Store.

Though some features were restored in later updates, the scrolling timeline and Swarm check-ins remained absent. In January 2017, co-founder and CEO Jonathan Wegener stepped down, and was replaced by design lead Matt Raoul. Wegener stated his resignation was unrelated to the redesign.

=== Data breach (2018) ===
On July 4, 2018, Timehop experienced a data breach affecting approximately 21 million users. Compromised data included names, email addresses, phone numbers, and some access tokens for connected social media accounts.

The company revoked all compromised tokens and implemented security measures including multifactor authentication.

== Devices ==
Timehop is available as a free app on iOS and Android devices and can be downloaded via the App Store or Google Play.

== Awards ==
- May 2017 Webby Awards, Best Social App
