= Comic book archive =

File format

Comic book archive file
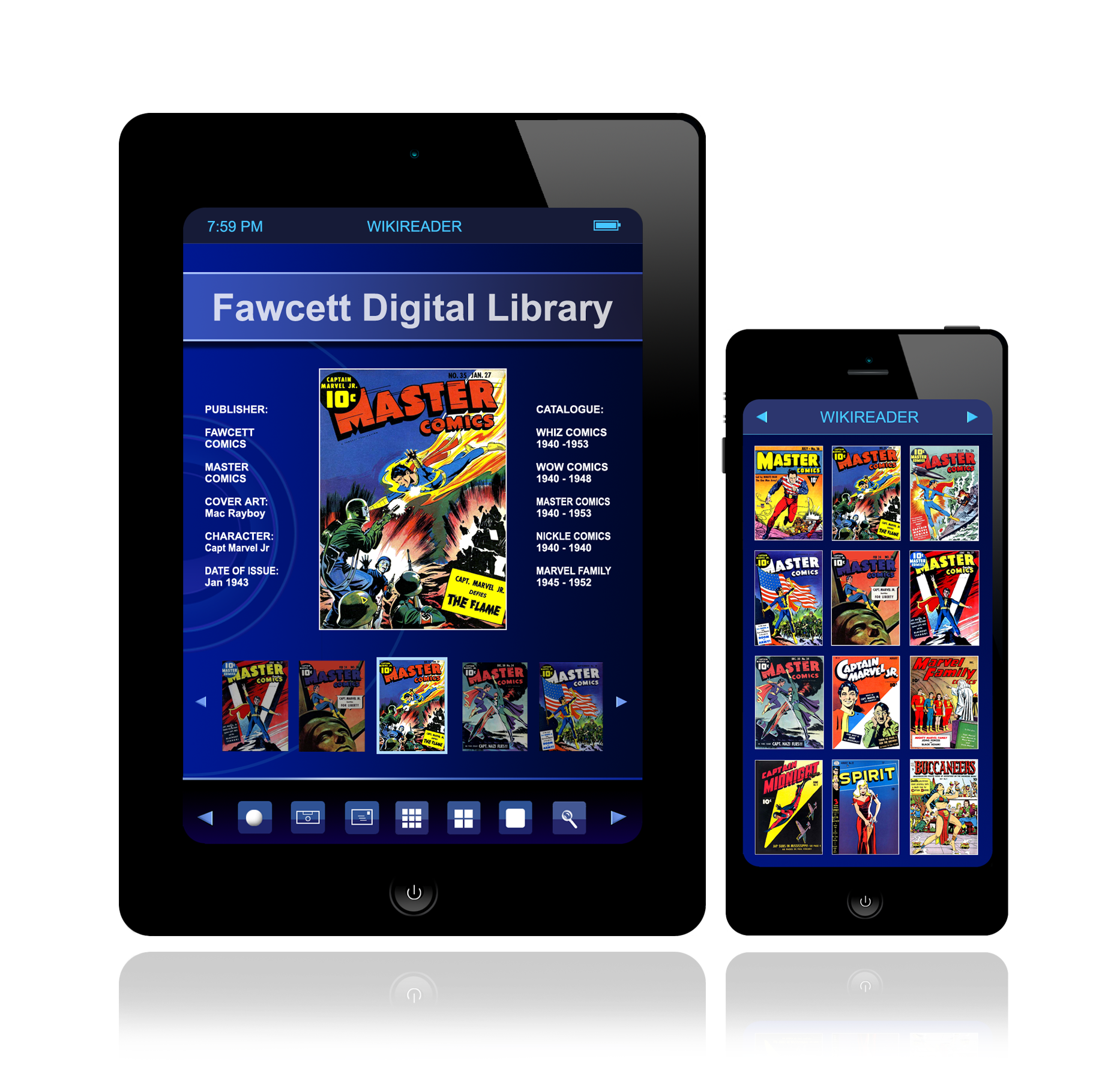
- Comic book archives may be accessed via tablets or smartphones.
- Filename extension: .cbr, .cbz, .cbt, .cba, .cb7 (containers)
- Internet media type: application/vnd.comicbook+zip [.cbz only], application/vnd.comicbook-rar [.cbr only]
- Developed by: David Ayton
- Type of format: Multimedia, archive file
- Container for: Images
- Standard: None

A comic book archive or comic book reader file (also called sequential image file) is a type of archive file for the purpose of sequential viewing of images, commonly for comic books. The idea was made popular by David Ayton, creator of the CDisplay sequential image viewer; since then, many viewers for different platforms have been created.

== Design ==
Comic book archives are not distinct file formats. They are a filename extension naming convention (renamed archive file formats listed below).

The filename extension indicates the archive type used:

- .cb7 → 7z
- .cba → ACE
- .cbr → RAR
- .cbt → TAR
- .cbz → ZIP

Comic book archive files mainly consist of a series of image files with specific naming, typically PNG (lossless compression) or JPEG (lossy compression, not JPEG-LS or JPEG XT) files, stored as a single archive file. Occasionally GIF, BMP, and TIFF files are seen. Folders may be used to group images in a more logical layout within the archive, like book chapters.

Comic book archive viewers typically offer various dedicated functions to read the content, like one page forward/backwards, go to first/last page, zoom or print. Some applications support additional tag information in the form of embedded XML files in the archive or use of the ZIP comment to store additional information. These files can include additional information like artists, story information, table of contents or even a separate text layer for comic book translations. The first image in the archive typically is used as the cover image.

== Adoption ==
=== Android ===
- FBReader supports CBZ/CBR files on Android via the ComicBook plugin available from its website.
- Perfect Viewer supports CBZ/CBR/CB7/LHZ/CBT files on Android.
- PocketBook Reader App supports CBZ/CBR/CBT files on Android and iOS.

=== Mac ===
- Calibre can view, library manage and convert to different formats.

=== Unix-like ===
- Calibre can view and convert to different formats.
- Comic Seer (Desktop) is a comic book archive viewer and organizer for the desktop.
- Evince, a document viewer, includes support for the format.
- MComix is a fork of the now discontinued comic reader Comix.
- MuPDF is a cross-platform, open source PDF, XPS, and e-book viewer.
- Okular can view many formats, including PDF and CBR, and is included in the KDE Software Compilation.
- Zathura is a document viewer that supports comic book archive files via plugins. Project website

=== Windows ===
- Calibre e-book reader can view and convert comic archives to different formats
- CDisplay (no longer available) was the first application to support the CBR format.
- CDisplayEx, inspired by CDisplay with additional viewing features.
- Comic Seer (Desktop) is a comic book archive viewer and organizer for the desktop.
- Comics++ Free comics and manga viewer for ZIP/CBZ, RAR/CBR, 7z/CB7, PDF, and directories. Written in C++/CX.
- Gonvisor is a comic reader simple to use with some features to improve image quality.
- STDU Viewer
- SumatraPDF

== See also ==
- Comparison of image viewers
