= DigiKam =

Free image organizer

digiKam

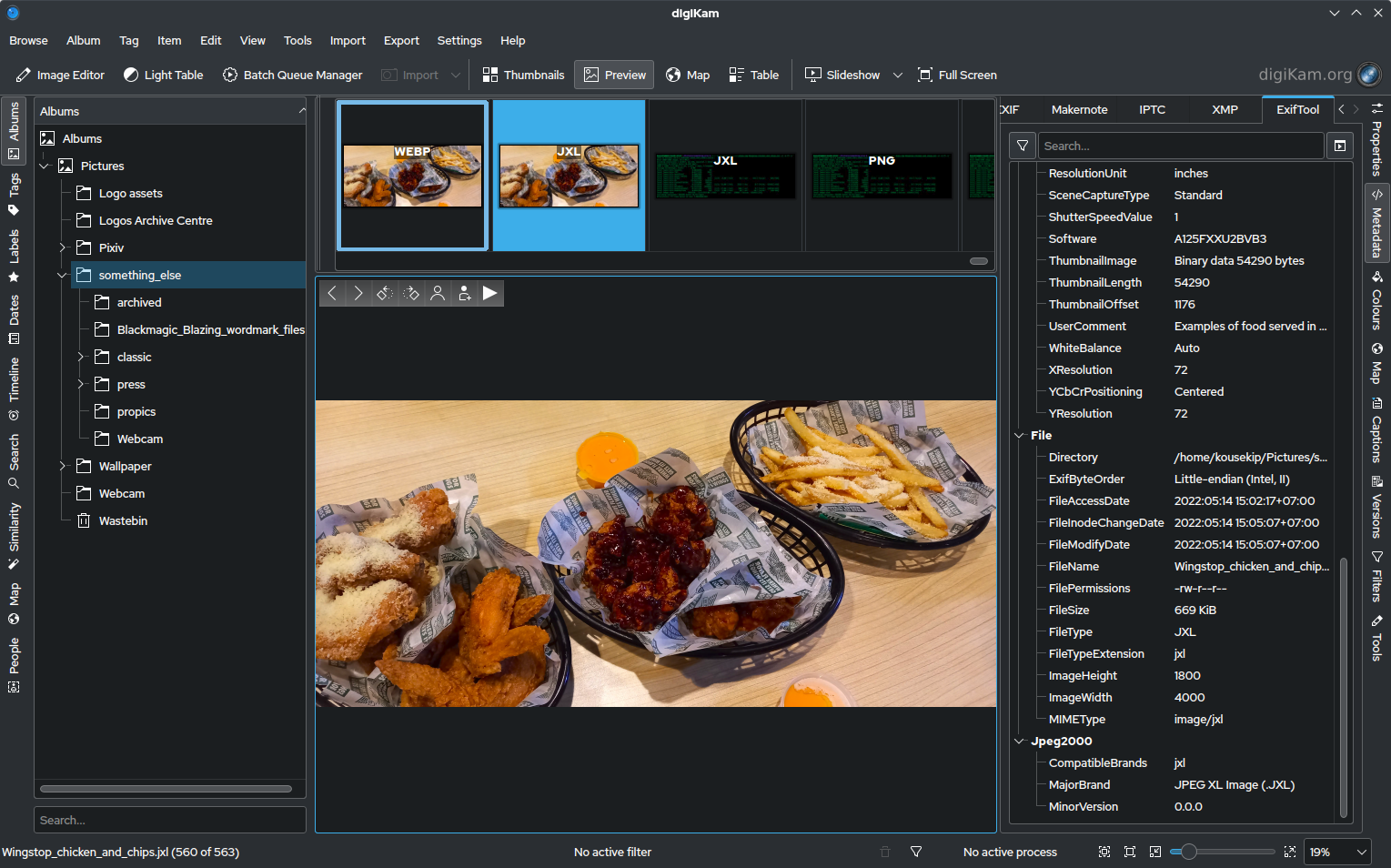
- Developer: KDE
- Stable release: 8.8.0 / 19 October 2025
- Repository: https://invent.kde.org/graphics/digikam.git
- Written in: C++ (Qt)
- Operating system: Linux, Windows, macOS
- Type: Image viewer; Image organizer; Post-production tool
- License: GPL-2.0-or-later
- Website: www.digikam.org

digiKam is a free and open-source image organizer and tag editor written in C++ using the KDE Frameworks.

== Features ==
digiKam runs on most known desktop environments and window managers, as long as the required libraries are installed. It supports all major image file formats, such as JPEG and PNG as well as over 200 raw image formats and can organize collections of photographs in directory-based albums, or dynamic albums by date, timeline, or by tags. Users can also add captions and ratings to their images, search through them and save searches for later use. Using plug-ins, users can export albums to various online services including (among others) 23hq, Facebook, Flickr, Gallery2, Google Earth's KML files, Yandex.Fotki, MediaWiki, Rajce, SmugMug, Piwigo, Simpleviewer, Picasa Web Albums. Plug-ins are also available to enable burning photos to a CD and the creation of web galleries.

digiKam provides functions for organizing, previewing, downloading and/or deleting images from digital cameras. Basic auto-transformations can also be deployed on the fly during picture downloading. In addition, digiKam offers image enhancement tools through its KIPI (KDE Image Plugins Interface) framework and its own plugins, like red-eye removal, color management, image filters, or special effects. digiKam was the only free photo management application on Linux that could handle 16 bit/channel images, until RawTherapee version 4.0 was released in 2011, using a new 32 bits/channel engine for all internal image processing. Digital Asset Management is the mainstay of digiKam.

digiKam relies on libraries such as exiv2, allowing it to edit XMP metadata embedded in images or separately as sidecar files. It also supports DNG format reading and writing. Marble is also integrated for editing and viewing of geolocations in images.

digiKam also efficiently caches image thumbnails and paths in a database, in the PGF format, allowing for quick overviews. There are various database backends to choose from, with scalability and portability considerations taken into account. This database file is independent of photo libraries, enabling remote paths, multiple roots and offline backups.

As a non-modal image editor; digiKam's UI also supports live search boxes in both sidebars and the main window.

== History ==
digiKam has been in development since before 2006.

As of version 0.9 features include a GPS locator and synchronization, iPod Photo upload support, an advanced metadata editor, better support for raw image formats (using dcraw included in digiKam), full color management, a light-table, pan-tool in Image Editor and Preview mode, improvements in usability, and many new plugins.

digiKam 2.0 was released in July 2011, sporting a number of new features, including:

- Face detection and recognition support
- XMP sidecar support
- Reverse geocoding
- Image versioning
- Pick Labels & Color Labels support to improve photographic workflow
- Many new RAW decoding features

In August 2018 a beta version of DigiKam 6.0 was published. Improvements comprise support for video files used as photos, as well as new RAW and export options.

== Face detection and recognition ==
Starting with version 2.0, digiKam has introduced face recognition allowing you to automatically identify photos of certain people and tag them. DigiKam's photo manager was the first free project to feature similar functionality, with face recognition previously implemented only in proprietary products such as Google Picasa, Apple's Photos, and Windows Live Photo Gallery.

Face recognition was implemented in version 2.0 through the libface library, and from version 3.3 it is based on OpenTLD project work. Version 7.0.0-beta1 uses the Deep Neural Network module from the OpenCV library.

== Other OS ==
- Windows: Install digiKam via KDE Installer with digiKam-msvc.
- There is an official port on macOS that can be compiled from raw or using MacPorts.
- Most other Unix-like OSes are also supported.

== Awards received ==
digiKam has been awarded the TUX 2005, 2008, and 2010 Readers' Choice Award in the category Favorite Digital Photo Management Tool.

== See also ==
- Comparison of image viewers
- Shotwell – digital photo manager by GNOME
- gThumb
- Gwenview
- KPhotoAlbum
- List of free and open source software packages
