= Camera Image File Format =

File format

Camera Image File Format (CIFF)
- Filename extension: .crw
- Internet media type: image/x-canon-crw
- Developed by: Canon, CIFF Forum
- Initial release: 12 February 1997; 29 years ago
- Latest release: Image Data Format version 1.0 revision 4; File/Directory Organization version 1.0 revision 3; 24 December 1997; 9 February 1998; 28 years ago
- Type of format: raw image format
- Extended to: DCF 1.0 (JEIDA-49-2-1998)
- Website: ciff-forum.com (Dead link)

In digital photography, the Camera Image File Format (CIFF) file format is a raw image format designed by Canon, and also used as a container format to store metadata in APP0 of JPEG images. Its specification was released on February 12, 1997.

The CIFF standard consists of two parts, CIFF Specification on Image Data File (last revision: version 1.0 revision 4, dated 24 December 1997) and CIFF Specification on File/Directory organization and File Handling Protocol (last revision: version 1.0 revision 3, dated 9 February 1998). The format was developed and maintained by Canon with input from the CIFF Forum. The format is no longer used by Canon, having been superseded by the CR2 file format.

== Digital cameras ==
The CRW format was supported by some earlier Canon digital cameras:

- Canon EOS D30
- Canon EOS D60
- Canon EOS 10D
- Canon EOS 300D
- Canon Powershot Pro1
- Canon Powershots G1-G6
- Canon Powershots S30-S70

== Software that supports CRW ==
Besides Canon's ZoomBrowser and Digital Photo Professional, several other software programs provide read support, and sometimes write support, for CRW files including:

- Adobe Photoshop
- Aperture
- darktable
- dcraw
- ExifTool
- LibRaw
- Picasa
- RawTherapee

== See also ==
- Raw image format
- Comparison of image viewers
- other digital negative formats
