= GraphicConverter =

Computer graphic software

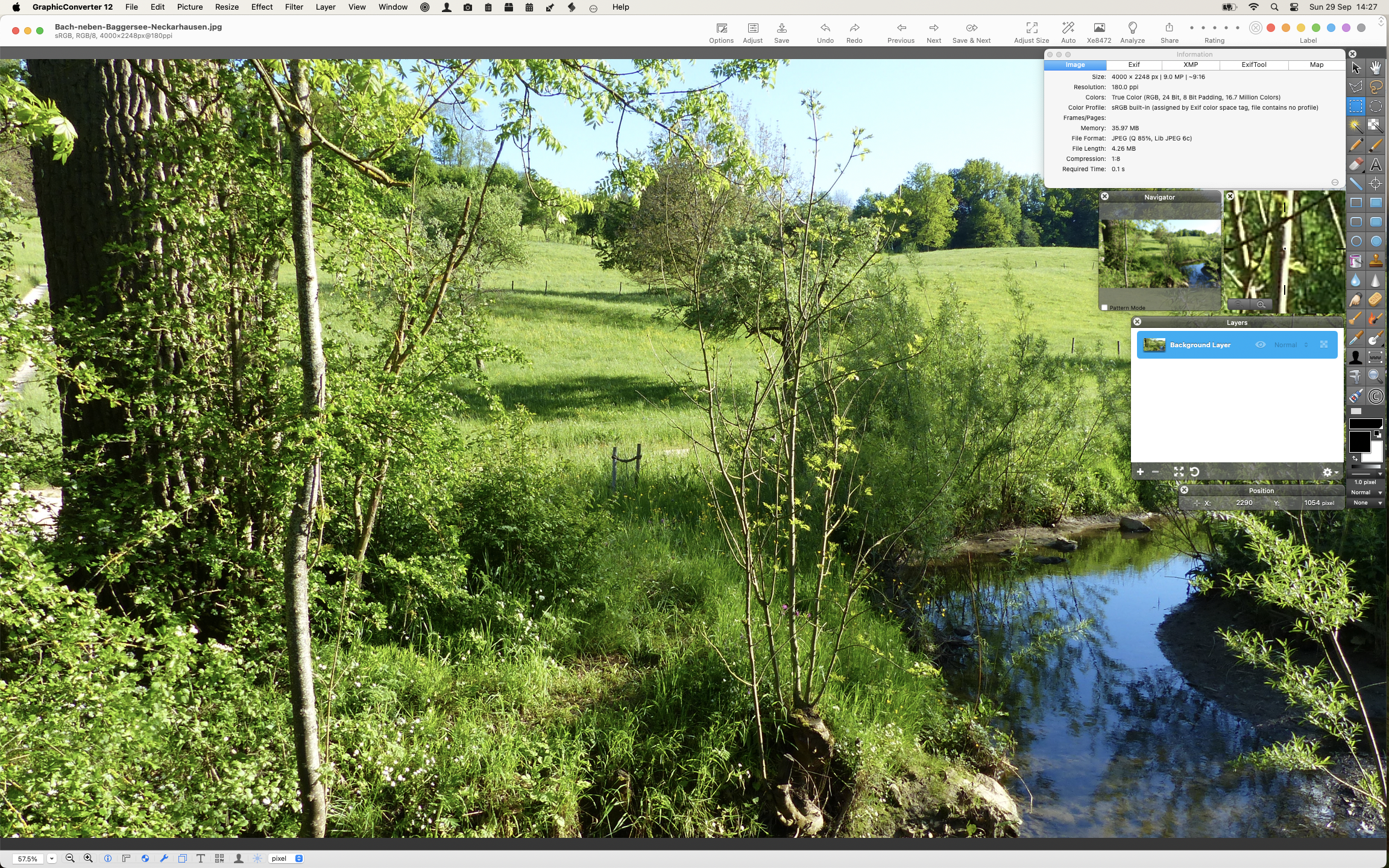
- Screenshot of GraphicConverter 12.2 displaying Bach-neben-Baggersee-Neckarhausen.jpg (a file from Wikimedia Commons), including various floating windoid editing tools
- Developer: Lemke Software GmbH
- Release: 1992; 34 years ago
- Stable release: 12.2.1 / September 30, 2024; 21 months ago
- Preview release: 12.2.2 beta build 6646 / October 24, 2024; 20 months ago
- Operating system: macOS 10.13 or greater
- Type: Graphics editor
- License: Shareware
- Website: www.lemkesoft.de/en/products/graphicconverter/

GraphicConverter is computer software for macOS that allows display and edits to raster graphics files. It also converts files between different formats.

The program has a long history of supporting the Apple Macintosh platform, and at times it has been bundled with new Mac purchases.

As of 2024, GraphicConverter can import about 200 file types and export 80. Images can also be retouched, edited, and transformed using tools, effects and filters. The software supports most Adobe Photoshop plug-ins, including TWAIN. The application features a batch processor, slideshow mode, image preview browser, and access to metadata comments (such as XMP, Exif, and IPTC).

GraphicConverter is available in more than a dozen languages including:

- Brazilian Portuguese
- Chinese (simplified)
- Chinese (traditional)
- English
- French
- German
- Czech
- Spanish

Old versions that run on classic Mac OS are available for download and include a license key. These versions are no longer supported, however.

The currently supported version runs on macOS, is available as shareware, and is maintained by LemkeSoft, a software company based in Peine, Lower Saxony, Germany.

== See also ==
- Comparison of raster graphics editors
