= Harry's Filters =

Harry's Filters is a plugin for Adobe Photoshop, which includes a set of 69 different image effects. There are 9 main effect categories including, among others, warp, pattern or color effects. Each main category then contains a series of parameters to fine-tune the effect.

The plugin also features a "jump" button, which selects a random effect and applies it to the picture. It serves mainly to quickly experiment with the various effects. Each effect configuration can be saved and reused later on.
