= XnView =

Software for reading, viewing, and processing images

XnView Classic

- XnView Classic on Windows 11
- Original author: Pierre-Emmanuel Gougelet
- Developer: XnSoft
- Release: 1.0a / 1997; 29 years ago
- Stable release: 2.52.7 / 22 September 2026; 19 days ago
- Written in: C, C++
- Engine: GFL (Graphics File Library)
- Operating system: Windows
- Platform: x86
- Size: 5.4 to 24 MB
- Available in: 46 languages
- List of languages Afrikaans, Arabic, Basque, Belarusian, Bulgarian, Catalan, Chinese (Simplified), Chinese (Traditional), Croatian, Czech, Danish, Dutch, Estonian, Farsi, Finnish, French, Galician, German, Greek, Hebrew, Hungarian, Icelandic, Indonesian, Italian, Japanese, Korean, Latvian, Lithuanian, Malay, Norwegian, Polish, Portuguese, Portuguese (Brazil), Romanian, Russian, Serbian, Slovak, Slovenian, Spanish, Swedish, Thai, Turkish, Ukrainian, Uzbek, Vietnamese, Welsh
- Type: Image viewer, editor and organizer
- License: Freeware for private, educational or non-profit use; otherwise commercial software
- Website: www.xnview.com/en/xnview-classic/

XnView MP

- XnView MP on Windows 11
- Original author: Pierre-Emmanuel Gougelet
- Developer: XnSoft
- Release: 0.1 / 17 October 2008; 17 years ago
- Stable release: 1.12.1 / 29 September 2026; 12 days ago
- Written in: C++ (Qt)
- Operating system: Windows, macOS, Linux
- Platform: x64, ARM64
- Size: 63 to 132 MB
- Available in: 28 languages
- List of languages Armenian, Bulgarian, Catalan, Chinese (Simplified), Chinese (Traditional), Czech, Danish, Dutch, Estonian, Finnish, French, German, Hungarian, Italian, Japanese, Korean, Norwegian, Polish, Portuguese, Portuguese (Brazil), Romanian, Russian, Slovak, Slovenian, Spanish, Swedish, Turkish, Ukrainian
- Type: Image viewer, editor and organizer
- License: Freeware for private, educational or non-profit use; otherwise commercial software
- Website: www.xnview.com/en/xnview-mp/

XnView is an image viewer, editor, and organizer that also provides file management capabilities. It reads more than 500 image formats, writes more than 70, and supports batch processing, including renaming, conversion, and metadata editing.

XnView is available in two editions: XnView MP, a modern cross-platform version, and XnView Classic, the legacy Windows version, which continues to receive maintenance updates. Both editions are available as standard installers and portable archives.

It is licensed as freeware for private, educational, and non-profit use, and as commercial software for other uses.

== History ==
Development began around 1990 on Atari systems, where Pierre-Emmanuel Gougelet wrote the initial code for an image-processing library that later formed the basis of XnView, XnView Pocket, NConvert, and the GFL SDK. The command-line tools NView and NConvert were subsequently ported to Silicon Graphics workstations. In 1995, NView was given a graphical interface using the Motif toolkit.

=== XnView (Classic) ===
Following its initial Windows release in 1997, XnView was ported to multiple platforms, including Linux, macOS, Solaris, FreeBSD, HP-UX, AIX, IRIX, and PocketPC. In parallel, the command-line tools NView and NConvert, based on the same GFL processing engine, were adapted for additional systems such as Atari, OS/2, and BeOS.

During the 2000s, development of non-Windows versions of XnView was gradually discontinued, and the Windows version became the primary maintained platform. Cross-platform support was later reintroduced with XnView MP.

=== XnView Deluxe ===
Around 2002, an extended commercial edition named XnView Deluxe was developed for Xzeos Software. The Deluxe edition expanded the freeware XnView package with additional multimedia and image-management capabilities, including PDF and HTML viewing, archive browsing, slideshow export to video and executable formats, audio playback, FTP and email integration, advanced search functions, and enhanced web gallery generation.

Development, distribution, and sales of XnView Deluxe were discontinued on 1 January 2006 due to strong competition from established commercial photo-management software, which prevented the product from gaining a significant market share. Several features introduced in XnView Deluxe were later incorporated into the standard freeware versions of XnView.

=== XnView MP ===
In 2008, a new Multi-Platform (MP) version of the software was introduced, while the original application became known as XnView Classic.

XnView MP was rewritten in C++ using the Qt framework and released for Windows, macOS, and Linux. The new architecture introduced Unicode support, native 64-bit support, and more efficient use of multi-core processors. Editing tools and support for many image formats that were previously available only as external plugins were also integrated into the application.

XnView MP is under active development, whereas XnView Classic is in maintenance mode and primarily receives bug fixes.

== Features ==
XnView Classic and XnView MP share a largely similar core feature set, although several advanced capabilities are exclusive to XnView MP (marked with an asterisk).

Format support

- Reading: supports over 500 image formats
  - Support for vector graphics (PS, EPS, AI, PDF) can be added with Ghostscript.
    However, SVG support in the Classic version requires a commercial CAD plugin.
  - Supports audio and video file formats
- Writing: supports exporting to over 70 image formats

Viewing and navigation

- Flexible display options for the main image, thumbnails, and information overlay
- Slideshow creation with transition effects
- Image comparison using an A/B slider and comparison of up to four images simultaneously*
- Detection of duplicate and similar images
- Advanced file search

Image editing

- Image transformation: resizing, rotation, and cropping, including Lossless JPEG transformation
- Color adjustment: brightness, contrast, gamma, auto-levels/contrast, and color depth/palette modification
- Drawing tool for adding text, annotations, and watermarks
- Image filters and effects

Cataloging and Metadata support

- Thumbnails and Metadata caching
- EXIF, IPTC and XMP* metadata support
- Embedded ICC color profile support
- Albums* and Keyword Sets*
- Face detection*

Batch processing

- Batch renaming
- Batch conversion
- Batch timestamp modification

Creation tools and Utilities

- Image splitting/stitching, generation of contact sheets and video thumbnail gallery
- File listing and archives creation
- Screen capture
- Printing and TWAIN scanner support

Plugins support

- .8bf Photoshop plugins, eg Harry's Filters, G'MIC

== Reception ==
=== XnView Classic ===
The original version was widely praised for its lightweight design, fast startup times, and extensive image format support, often being described as a versatile image-management utility.

Due to its legacy architecture, the Classic version lacks native Unicode support, which can cause issues when handling non-Latin file paths. It also lacks out-of-the-box support for newer image formats like AVIF and JPEG XL, while HEIC support requires an external plugin.

=== XnView MP ===
The multi-platform successor expanded the capabilities of the Classic version to macOS and Linux while introducing Unicode support, 64-bit compatibility, and multi-core processing. Reviewers highlighted improvements across nearly all aspects of the application, including UI/UX refinement, metadata handling, batch processing, and additional functionality.

However, the extensive and highly detailed settings can still present a significant learning curve for beginner users.

=== Usage and development ===
XnView's development relies closely on community feedback, with the official forum serving as the primary hub for reporting bugs and proposing new features. The application's creator actively participates in these discussions, tracking and documenting resolved issues and implemented features in an official development log and changelog hosted via MantisBT.

The software has also been referenced in academic research involving DICOM image handling and digital watermarking techniques. In 2006, Sveriges Television (SVT) recommended it in their High Definition Multi Format Test Set.

== Related software ==
The developer has also released several related applications and tools, including:

Software	Description	Platforms	Development status
NConvert	CLI batch convert tool	Windows, Linux, macOS	Active
XnConvert	GUI batch convert tool	Windows, Linux, macOS	Active
XnShell	File Explorer shell extension	Windows	Active
XnResize	Image resizer	Windows, Linux, macOS	Active
XnRetro	Used to assign vintage or instant effects to images	Windows, Linux, macOS	Maintenance
XnSketch	Transforms images into cartoon or sketch renderings	Windows, Linux, macOS	Maintenance
Xn (Mobile)	Mobile apps including Hypocam, ResizeMe!, XnConvert, Coleka, etc.	iOS, Android	Active
GFL-SDK	Free developer library used in tools by third parties	Windows, Linux, Mac OS X	Discontinued
NView	CLI predecessor of XnView	DOS	Discontinued

== See also ==
- Comparison of image viewers
- Comparison of raster graphics editors
