= IrfanView =

Image viewer, editor and converter program

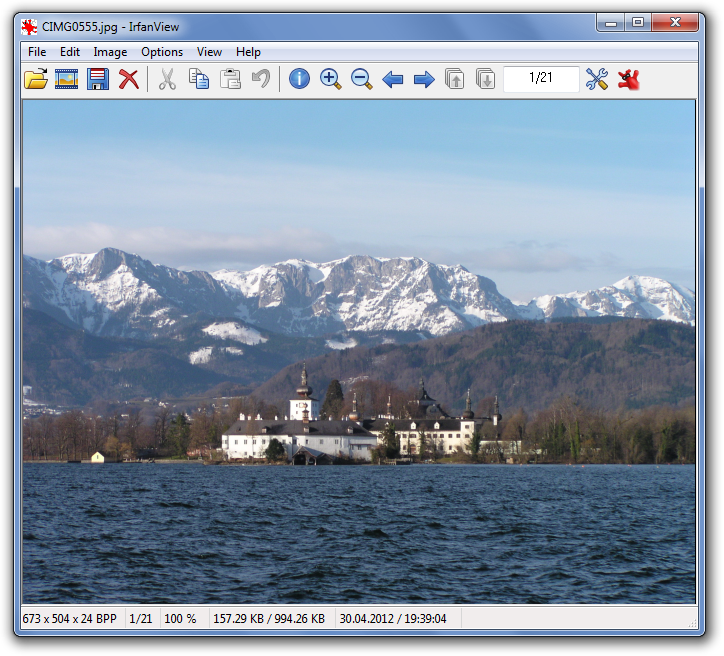
- IrfanView version 4.33 showing a photo of Schloss Ort
- Developer: Irfan Škiljan
- Release: 1 June 1996; 30 years ago
- Stable release: 4.76 / 18 September 2026; 2 months ago
- Operating system: Microsoft Windows
- Size: 3.57 MB (IrfanView 64-bit); 26.02 MB (Plugins 64-bit)
- Available in: English, German; Other languages available as download.
- Type: Image viewer
- License: Proprietary, free for non-commercial use
- Website: www.irfanview.com

IrfanView (/ˈɪərfænvjuː/) is an image viewer, editor, organizer and converter program for Microsoft Windows. It can also play video and audio files, and has some image creation and painting capabilities. IrfanView is free for non-commercial use; commercial use requires paid registration. It is noted for its small size, speed, ease of use, and ability to handle a wide variety of graphic file formats. It was first released in 1996.

IrfanView is named after its creator, Irfan Škiljan, from Jajce, Bosnia and Herzegovina, living in Lower Austria. The current version of IrfanView, 4.73, works under all versions of Windows from Windows XP to Windows 11. Version 4.44 and older versions were compatible with Windows 95/98/Me and can also be run in Linux under Wine and in macOS using WineBottler.

== Features ==
IrfanView is specifically optimized for fast image display and loading times. It supports viewing and saving of numerous file types including image formats such as BMP, GIF, JPEG, JP2 & JPM (JPEG2000), PNG (includes the optimizer OptiPNG; APNG can be read), TIFF, raw photo formats from digital cameras, ECW (Enhanced Compressed Wavelet), EMF (Enhanced Windows Metafile), FSH (EA Sports format), ICO (Windows icon), PCX (Zsoft Paintbrush), PBM (Portable BitMap), PDF (Portable Document Format), PGM (Portable GrayMap), PPM (Portable PixelMap), TGA (Truevision Targa), WebP, FLIF (Free Lossless Image Format) and viewing of media files such as Flash, Ogg, Vorbis, MPEG, MP3, MIDI, and text files.

Image editing includes crop, resize, and rotate. Images can be adjusted by modifying their brightness, contrast, tint, and gamma level manually or automatically, and by converting them between file formats. Many of these changes can be applied to multiple images in one operation using batch processing.

A plugin allows IrfanView to support lossless JPG operations: horizontal or vertical flip, rotation by 90° increments, and cropping.

=== Plugins ===
IrfanView uses plugins to handle several additional images, video, and sound formats and to add optional functionality such as filter processing or other program features. With its diverse set of format plugins, the program has been recommended for viewing obscure image formats, or corrupted files, which commercial photo editing software cannot read.

=== Search engine toolbar ===
Prior to version 4.41 installer versions of IrfanView supported a number of browser toolbars. Version 4.40 optionally installed the Amazon 1Button App (formerly the Amazon Browser bar).

== Reception ==
Irfanview has been positively reviewed as "really good" for easily and rapidly viewing and manipulating images, with its editing and drawing tools. Other writers have focused on its ability to open a wide variety of image formats. In a series of image quality tests conducted in 2004, compared with commercial image compressors and Adobe Photoshop 7, Irfanview 3.91 produced "consistently better images than the Adobe Photoshop JPEG encoder at the same data rate", and its JPEG2000 compression quality "closely followed" the best codec, JasPer." According to IrfanView's official website, since 2003, IrfanView has been downloaded over 1 million times per month. One independent review in 2017 described Irfanview, as "the Swiss Army Knife of image viewers".

== Author ==
Irfan Škiljan graduated from the Vienna University of Technology. In a 2006 interview, then 32-year-old Škiljan said that he was able to more or less live off the software, generating income with the sale of licenses for commercial users and of special versions for different customers.

=== Pronunciation ===
The author has said the software is pronounced as "EarfanView"; it is named after himself and is an Islamic Arabic name, Irfan.

=== Logo/mascot ===
According to Škiljan, the IrfanView logo and mascot is a "road cat" (there is a tire track across the smallest and the biggest icon for Windows Explorer, as well as the version for Microsoft Store) but that he "likes cats", and the icon is "a joke" – the IrfanView website pictures him holding a white domestic cat.

== See also ==
- Comparison of image viewers
- Comparison of raster graphics editors
- Computer graphics – Graphics created using computers
