= Zoner Studio =

Digital photo editor

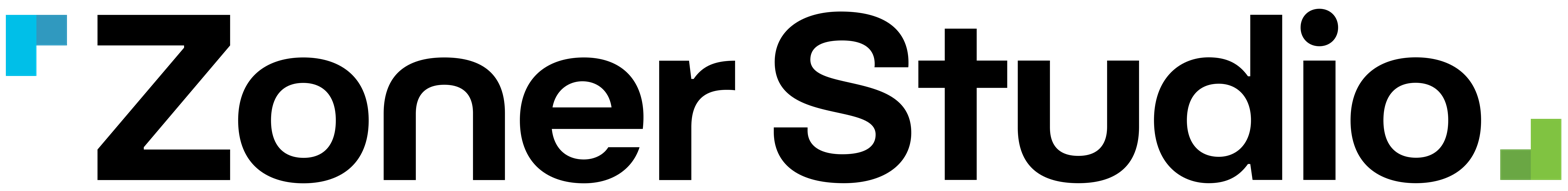
- Developer: Zoner Software
- Stable release: 19.2409.2.593 / 10 January 2025; 21 months ago
- Operating system: Windows
- Platform: Intel Pentium (32-bit / 64-bit)
- Available in: English, German, Czech, Slovak, Japanese, etc. (older versions were available in more languages)
- Type: Photo editor
- License: Subscription based, 7 day trial version
- Website: www.zoner.com

Zoner Studio is a software application developed by Zoner Software. It includes a bitmap editor and image file manager used for editing digital photographs. It is used in its country of origin (Czech Republic) and around the world. It is based on subscription model and new update is published twice a year.

As of 2026, this software is available for the Windows operating system.

== History ==
In 2004, Zoner Media Explorer was renamed Zoner Photo Studio because the product focus switched to strictly digital photography.

=== Version 12 ===
Version 12 introduced the program's division into modules: Manager, Viewer, Editor, and raw module, to increase the ease of working simultaneous with photo management, editing, etc. It added a default charcoal gray interface, intended to ease photo viewing.

=== Updates ===
• Version 13 brought support for dual monitors and 64-bit versions of Windows.

• Version 14 brought support for batch upload to the developer's Zonerama web gallery service and GPU acceleration via CUDA and OpenCL.

• Version 15 added an Import module.

• Version 16 completed the Editor's switch to using the Side Panel.

• Version 17 revamped the raw module and made the Catalog more central to the Manager.

=== Version 18 ===
Zoner Photo Studio 18 was released on September 16, 2015. It brought a major interface change. The five modules were merged into three: Manager, Develop, and Editor. The Viewer module has been replaced by a separate browser, the Import module by a button in the lower left part of the interface. Develop enables non-destructive edits to raw files and other supported files. The modules have a unified structure – the navigator is on the left, the photo in the middle and the histogram and tools panel on the right. This version was subscription based and added fine-tuned retouching tools and support for layer-based editing.

=== Version Zoner Photo Studio X ===
On September 19, 2016, the software was transferred to Zoner Photo Studio X and Zoner has switched from a business model of selling lifetime licenses to a subscription system, to which it provides updates twice a year (for free). Version ZPS X brought layers, ordering printed photo products directly from the software and many more improvements over the years - for example full support of HEIF format, dozens of free presets, its own cloud storage Zoner Photo Cloud, faster and more effective workflow with RAW format, color shifting and split toning, AI tools or completely renewed video editor. The Create module offers the ability to create a calendar, photo book, painting, collage, postcard or HD video from user´s own photos. It is now possible to share photos or albums on the Zonerama gallery, Facebook, Twitter, e-mail, send Zoner Postcards directly from the program interface.

=== Zoner Photo Studio X becomes Zoner Studio ===
In 2025, Zoner Photo Studio X rebranded to Zoner Studio. Subscription terms stayed the same and 2025 spring update brought even more AI tools – Subject, Background, Sky and Object. Other improvements were for example Color Range and Luminance Range Masking Tools, AI Selections or Multi-Canvas Prints or collages for social media.

==== Spring 2025 ====
New Color Range and Luminance Range masking tools, new AI tools (Subject, Background, Sky, Objec), multi-Canvas Prints etc.

==== Autumn 2025 ====
Enhanced AI detail preview, smart photo upscaling, easy edit comparison with split view, improved photo book editing, new crop marks, and introduced more handy features to make everyday editing smoother.

==== Summer 2026 ====
This update brought new Photo stacking fetaures such as Focus stacking, Exposure Bracketing and Panorama, new Photo Search replacing Quick Search and significantly expanding filtering options, also improved photo series workflow, Smart Healing and other news.

== Program environment ==
The program guides users through the complete workflow of photo processing, from uploading and viewing images to processing them in individual modules and printing photo products or exporting finished videos.

Users can manage their photos using the Catalog, a handy tool for organizing, accessing, and managing photo collection efficiently. It works by indexing photos, storing metadata, and creating thumbnails for quick browsing. However, importing to the Catalog is not necessary.

=== Manager Module – Photo Organization ===
The Manager module is used for organizing photos. It allows sorting and displaying metadata – Exif photo information, captions (title, author, description, …), keywords, audio notes, digital signature, GPS data. Images can be assigned tags and ratings and content can be filtered according to them. This module also allows batch processing of files.

=== Develop Module – RAW File Processing ===
Up to version 17 (inclusive) under the name “RAW Module”, it enabled the conversion of RAW data to raster formats. Since version 18, it allows lossless, non-destructive editing of all image files. For better support of RAW data from digital cameras, it is advisable to connect ZS with a DNG converter. Since version 17, the RAW module also supports automatic correction of lens defects using LCP profiles.

=== Editor Module – Photo Manipulation ===
The Editor module is used for advanced photo editing. It is a classic bitmap editor that has been able to work with layers since version X.

=== Print Module – Creating photo products and videos ===
Since version X, users can create photo calendars, photo books, photos on canvas, collages or content for social networks directly in the program, all from their own photos. After ordering and paying, Zoner will send them directly to the user.

=== Video Module – Creating photo products and videos ===
A non-linear video editor with effects, clip transformations and keyframes.

== Zonerama ==
ZONER Software, a.s. also develops Zonerama, a free, unlimited online photo gallery, where it is possible to store, organize, and share photos and videos in full quality.

== Zoner Photo Cloud ==
Zoner Photo Cloud is a secure online storage service built into Zoner Studio. It’s a place for storing, organizing, and sharing photos and files. Every Zoner Studio user gets 20GB of free storage, with options to upgrade to 1TB or more if needed.

== Learn Photography ==
Developers of Zoner Studio also publish online photo magazine Learn Photography. Interesting articles about phototechnics, photography, inspiration and also lots of tutorials can be found on the magazine.

== System requirements ==
- OS: Microsoft Windows 11 or Microsoft Windows 10 (64 bit) – version 1903 or newer
- Processor: Intel or AMD that supports SSE 4.2
- Memory: 8 GB RAM
- Hard Drive: 2 GB
- Resolution: 1280×800 or higher

== Sources ==
- "Přehled novinek ZPS 15 a trial verze ke stažení" (in Czech).
- "Zoner Photo Studio 15 – snadný import a rychlé úpravy" (in Czech). DigiArena.cz. 9 October 2012.
- "List of new features or updates | Zoner Studio"
