= Image viewer =

Computer program

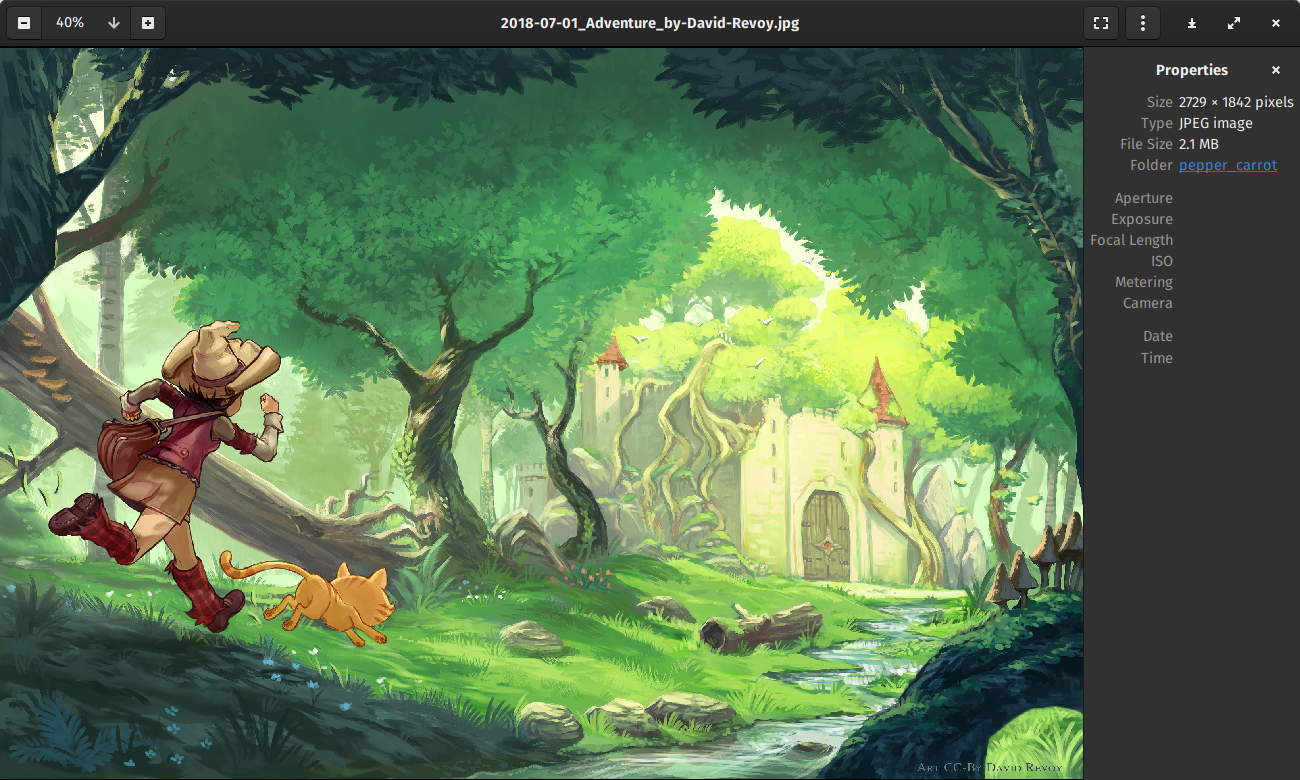
Eye of GNOME

An image viewer or image browser is a computer program that can display stored graphical images; it can often handle various graphics file formats. Such software usually renders the image according to properties of the display such as color depth, display resolution, and color profile.

Although one may use a full-featured raster graphics editor (such as Photoshop or GIMP) as an image viewer, these have many editing functionalities which are not needed for just viewing images, and therefore usually start rather slowly. Also, most viewers have functionalities that editors usually lack, such as stepping through all the images in a directory (possibly as a slideshow).

Image viewers give maximal flexibility to the user by providing a direct view of the directory structure available on a hard disk. Most image viewers do not provide any kind of automatic organization of pictures and therefore the burden remains on the user to create and maintain their folder structure (using tag- or folder-based methods). However, some image viewers also have features for organizing images, especially an image database, and hence can also be used as image organizer.

Some image viewers, such as Windows Photo Viewer that come with Windows operating systems, change a JPEG image if it is rotated, resulting in loss of image quality; others offer lossless rotation.

== Features ==
Typical features of image viewers are:

- basic viewing operations such as zooming and rotation
- fullscreen display
- slideshow
- thumbnail display
- printing
- screen capture
- photo editor (if installed)
- The ability to jump to a random file in the folder to facilitate searching.

Advanced features are:

- decode next image in advance and keep previous decoded image in memory for fast image changes
- display (and edit) metadata such as XMP, IPTC Information Interchange Model and Exif
- batch conversion (image format, image dimensions, etc.) and renaming
- create contact sheets
- create HTML thumbnail pages
- different transition effects for slideshows

== See also ==
- Comparison of image viewers
- Comparison of CAD, CAM and CAE file viewers
- Desktop organizer
- Image organizer
- Binary file § Viewing binary files
- Electronic document
- Media player
- Text editor
- Web browser
