= Comparison of raster graphics editors =

Raster graphics editors can be compared by many variables, including availability.

== List ==
Free and open-source software	Proprietary software	
Free and open-source software	Freeware, trialware, freemium, shareware	Commercial (paid)
CinePaint; Darktable; DigiKam; F-Spot (inactive); Fotografix; G'MIC; GIMP; GimPhoto; GNU Paint (inactive); GrafX2; GraphicsMagick; gThumb; Hugin; ImageJ; ImageMagick; KolourPaint; Krita; LazPaint; LightZone; mtPaint; MyPaint; Panorama Tools; Pencil2D; Phatch (inactive); Pinta; Rawstudio; RawTherapee; Seashore; Shotwell; Tux Paint; UFRaw	Ability Photopaint; ACD Canvas X (formerly Deneba Canvas); Acorn Image Editor; Artipic; ArtRage; Autodesk SketchBook Pro; Bloom Image Editor; Brush Strokes Image Editor; Chasys Draw IES; Clip Studio Paint; CodedColor PhotoStudio Pro; Erdas Imagine; FastStone Image Viewer; Fatpaint; GraphicConverter; Helicon Filter; IrfanView; Iridient Developer; Kid Pix; LiveQuartz; LView Pro; Microsoft Paint; NeoPaint; OpenCanvas; Paint Tool SAI; Paint.NET; Photogenics; PhotoLine; Photo Mechanic; Photos (Apple app); PhotoScape; Photopea; Pixelmator; Pixia; Pixlr; PMview; Portrait Professional; Project Dogwaffle; QFX; Retouch4me; Serif PhotoPlus; TVPaint; Xara Photo & Graphic Designer; XnView; Zoner Photo Studio	ACDSee; Adobe Photoshop; Adobe Photoshop Lightroom; Adobe Photoshop Elements; Affinity Photo; Capture One; Corel Painter; Corel Painter Essentials; Corel PaintShop Pro; Corel Photo-Paint; DxO PhotoLab; PicMonkey; Picsart; Procreate

Discontinued

- Adobe Fireworks
- Adobe ImageReady
- Adobe PhotoDeluxe
- Aldus PhotoStyler
- Apple Aperture
- ArtRage Starter Edition
- Barco Creator
- Bibble
- Brilliance
- Dazzle Draw
- Degas Elite
- Deluxe Paint
- Deluxe Paint Animation
- DigiPaint
- Dr. Halo
- DxO Optics Pro
- Impos/2
- iPhoto
- KoalaPainter
- MacPaint
- Microsoft Digital Image (formerly Microsoft Picture It!)
- Microsoft Office Picture Manager
- Microsoft Photo Editor
- NeoChrome
- PC Paintbrush
- PCPaint
- Picasa
- Picture Publisher
- PhotoPerfect
- Photon Paint
- Picnik
- Quantel Paintbox
- SuperPaint (Macintosh)
- Ulead PhotoImpact
- Unified Color HDR PhotoStudio
- xRes
- ArcSoft PhotoImpression

== General information ==
Basic general information about the editor: creator, company, license, etc.

Program	Description	Creator	First public release date	Latest stable version	Latest stable release date (Note: and dead/discontinuation notice)	List price (USD)	Software license
Ability Photopaint	Part of Ability Office	Ability Software	March 2001	10	May 1, 2020		Proprietary
ACDSee Home	Changed name in 2021 to Photo Studio Home			2020	December 18, 2019	$59	Proprietary
ACDSee Pro	Changed name in 2021 to Photo Studio Pro			2020	December 18, 2019	$99	Proprietary
ACDSee Ultimate	Changed name in 2021 to Photo Studio Ultimate			2020	December 18, 2019	$149	Proprietary
Acorn Image Editor	Image editor and graphics creator for macOS	Flying Meat Inc.	September 10, 2007	6.6.3	November 19, 2020		Proprietary
Adobe Fireworks*	Alternative to 1 targeted at web designers, discontinued after CS6	Macromedia	1998	CS6 / 12.0	May 7, 2012 (dead/discontinued)		Proprietary
Adobe Photoshop	Professional image editor and graphics creation tool	Adobe Systems	February 19, 1990	CC 2021 / 22.4.1	May 19, 2021	$9.99 per month	Proprietary
Adobe Photoshop Elements	Raster graphics editor for entry-level photographers, image editors and hobbyists			2021	October 8, 2020	$99	Proprietary
Adobe Photoshop Lightroom	Photo editor	Adobe Systems	February 19, 2007	10.0	October 19, 2020	$9.99 per month	Proprietary
Affinity Photo	Professional image editor for Windows, macOS and iOS	Serif Europe	July 9, 2015	1.9.0	February 4, 2021	$49.99	Proprietary
Artipic	Image editor for Windows and macOS	Artipic AB	2014	2.6	October 30, 2017		Proprietary
ArtRage	Digital paint program for tablet computers	Ambient Design	2004	6	June 2019		Proprietary
Artweaver	Emulates physical painting experience on a computer	Boris Eyrich	2002	7.0.10	October 3, 2021	Freeware	Proprietary
Autodesk SketchBook Pro	Paint and drawing toolset for use with digitized pen tablets & tablet computers	Autodesk	2004	8.4.3 (Android 4.0.6, iOS 4.1)		Freeware	Proprietary
Bibble*	Photo editor and organizer with camera raw file support	Bibble Labs	2000	5.2.3	2011		Proprietary
Bloom	Procedural node-based image editor	Sad Cat Software	2015	1.0.467	August 5, 2016		Proprietary
Brush Strokes Image Editor	Image editor like Windows Paint	Paul Bird	2004	2.0	? (dead/discontinued)	Freeware	Proprietary
Capture One	Professional raw converter and image editor	Phase One	2002	13.1.3	October 24, 2020		Proprietary
Chasys Draw IES	Image editor with layers, animation, icon edit, super-res, batch and camera raw	John Paul Chacha	2001	5.30.01	March 26, 2024	Freeware	Proprietary
CinePaint	Moving picture, photo and graphics editor	Robin Rowe	July 4, 2002	1.4.5	2021-05-30	Free	GPL-2.0-or-later
CodedColor PhotoStudio Pro	An bitmap graphics editor and image organizer for Windows pc	1STEIN Corp.	2001	8.2	February 8, 2020		Proprietary
Corel PaintShop Pro	Advanced image editor and graphics creator	Jasc Software	1992	2021 Update 1	October 22, 2020		Proprietary
Corel Painter	Made to create natural-looking artistic images (for Professional)	Mark Zimmer, Tom Hedges, John Derry	August 1991	2022	2021		Proprietary
Corel Painter Essentials	Made to create natural-looking artistic images (for beginner)	Mark Zimmer, Tom Hedges, John Derry	August 2003	8	December 12, 2020	$39.99	Proprietary
Corel PHOTO-PAINT	Professional image editor and graphics creator with advanced features, part of Corel Draw Graphics Suite	Corel Corporation	1992	2021	2021		Proprietary
darktable	Photography workflow application and raw developer	Johannes Hanika	April 2009	5.6.0	2026-06-21	Free	GPL-3.0-or-later
Deluxe Paint*	Efficient bitmap and true-color paint program with rendering features and advanced animation capabilities.	Dan Silva	1985	5.2	1995		Proprietary
Deneba Canvas X3	Graphics editor and creator supporting both raster graphics and vector graphics.It also work on GIS data.	Jorge Miranda, Joaquin de Soto, Manny Menendez	September 1987	14	2020		Proprietary
DigiKam	Free photo organizer and image editor	Renchi Raju, Gilles Caulier	2002	9.1.0	2026-06-07	Free	GPL-2.0-or-later
Digital Photo Professional	Photo organizer and image editor from Canon	Canon Inc.		4.14.0	March 10, 2021		Proprietary
DxO PhotoLab	RAW image editor	DxO Labs	October 26, 2017	7.5	March 1, 2024	€229	Proprietary
Erdas Imagine	Advanced remote sensing and GIS ability; handles multispectral images	ERDAS, Inc.	1980	2016 (16)	June 14, 2016		Proprietary
Fatpaint	Full featured web-based graphic design and photo editing application	Mersica Inc.	2010	1.99.55		Freeware	Proprietary
Fotografix	Free photo editor	Madhavan Lakshminarayanan	April 14, 2009	2022.6.1	June 11, 2022	Free	MIT
F-Spot	Image viewer and organizer for GNOME	Ettore Perazzoli	2005	0.8.2	2010-12-19	Free	MIT
G'MIC	Free command line software for 2D or 3D image processing and visualization	David Tschumperlé	October 2008	3.7.6	2026-05-13	Free	CECILL-2.1 or CECILL-C
GIMP	Free image editor and graphics creator	Spencer Kimball, Peter Mattis	January 1996	3.2.4	2026-04-19	Free	GPL-3.0-or-later
GimPhoto	Modification of the free and open-source graphics program GNU Image Manipulation Program (GIMP), with the intent to be a free alternative to Adobe Photoshop.	Ek Kian		24.1	December 30, 2014	Free	GPL-2.0-or-later
GIMPshop	GIMP with a GUI similar to Adobe Photoshop	Scott Moschella		2.2.11	2006 (dead/discontinued)	Free	GPL-2.0-or-later
GNU Paint	Free and open-source raster graphics editor for GTK 2	Andy Tai	September 10, 2007	0.3.3	2007-09-10 (dead/discontinued)	Free	GPL-3.0-or-later
GrafX2	GrafX2 with a GUI similar to Deluxe Paint	Sunset Design (Guillaume Dorme, Karl Maritaud)	1996	2.9		Free	GPL-2.0-only
GraphicConverter	Image viewer, converter, organizer and editor capable of importing around 200 and exporting 80 different image file types. Compatible with many Photoshop plug-ins	Thorsten Lemke	1992	11.5.1	July 1, 2021		Proprietary
GraphicsMagick	Commandline image converter and editor	GraphicsMagick Group	2002	1.3.47	2026-05-13	Free	MIT
gThumb	Image viewer and organizer for the GNOME desktop environment	Paolo Bacchilega	2001	3.12.10	2026-02-10	Free	GPL-2.0-or-later
HDR PhotoStudio	HDR (High Dynamic Range Editor) with human vision imaging model	Unified Color	October 2009	2.15.42	2010		Proprietary
Helicon Filter	Advanced image editor with a simplified tabbed interface, new Helicon Focus	Helicon Soft Ltd.	August 2004	7.6.6	2020		Proprietary
ImageJ	Image processing program developed at the National Institutes of Health. See ImageJ2 and FIJI for modified and extended versions.	Wayne Rasband (NIH)	1997	1.54r	2025-09-25	Free	Public domain
ImageMagick	Command line software suite for displaying, converting, and editing raster image files	ImageMagick Studio LLC	1990	7.1.2-26	2026-06-21	Free	ImageMagick
iPhoto*	Image organizer and basic editor for macOS; replaced by Photos	Apple Inc.	2002	9.6			Proprietary
IrfanView	Image and video viewer with basic editing functions	Irfan Skiljan	1996	4.58	May 26, 2021	$12 (commercial use)	Proprietary
Iridient Developer	Powerful raw image conversion application designed and optimized for macOS	Iridient Digital	2004	3.6.0	March 9, 2021		Proprietary
KolourPaint		KDE	2004	26.04.2	2026-05-29	Free	BSD
Krita	Digital painting oriented free and open-source raster graphic editor with vector support. KDE/Calligra based.	KDE	2005	5.3.2.1	2026-06-02	Free	GPL-3.0-only
LazPaint	Free multiplatform layered image editor	circular	2011	7.3	2025-05-24	Free	GPL-3.0-only
LiveQuartz	Basic multi-layer photo editor	Romain Piveteau	2005	2.8	December 1, 2018		Proprietary
MacPaint*	Obsolete basic editor	Bill Atkinson	1984	2.0			Proprietary
Microsoft Office Picture Manager*	Basic image editor	Microsoft	2002	14.0			Proprietary
Microsoft Paint	Basic graphic creator and editor packaged with Microsoft Windows operating systems	Microsoft	1985	10.19043	June 29, 2021		Proprietary
Microsoft Photo Editor*	Obsolete basic image editor for Windows	Microsoft	2000	3.01			Proprietary
mtPaint	Pixel art and photo editing application	Mark Tyler	September 13, 2004	3.50	2021-01-01	Free	GPL-3.0-or-later
MyPaint	Digital painting application	Martin Renold	March 12, 2005	2.0.1	2020-05-29	Free	GPL-2.0-or-later
NUFRaw	Raw image format processor, GTK 2, compatible with gimp 2.8 to 2.10, see also UFRaw	Matteo Lucarelli		0.43	March 2, 2020	Free	GPL-2.0-or-later
OpenCanvas		Portalgraphics	2000	7.0.25	2019		Proprietary
paint.net	Freeware image editor and graphics creator based on .NET	Rick Brewster, et al.	May 6, 2004	5.0.10 (64-bit only for Windows 11, Windows 10 (1809+), Windows Server 2019/2021)	October 1, 2023	Freeware	Proprietary
Paint Tool SAI*	Simple and lightweight painting software	Systemax Software	February 25, 2008	1.2.5	April 25, 2016	~$50 (5500JPY)	Proprietary
PC Paintbrush*	Obsolete basic editor	ZSoft Corporation	1984	5			Proprietary
Pencil2D	2D graphical animation software.	Pascal Naidon		0.7.2	2026-03-13	Free	GPL-2.0-only
Phatch	Editor for batch processing digital graphics and photographs.	Stani Michiels		0.2.7	2010 (dead/discontinued)	Free	GPL-3.0-or-later
Photogenics	Made to create 32-bit HDRs	Idruna Software Inc.	1995	HDR 7.0	? (dead/discontinued)		Proprietary
PhotoLine	Image editor with advanced features	Computerinsel (Germany)	1995	24.01	December 20, 2023	€59	Proprietary
Photopea	advanced web-based photo and graphics editor	Ivan Kutskir	2013	5.6	April 22, 2024	Freeware	Proprietary
PhotoPerfect*	Image editor with some advanced features	Arcadia Software AG, Joachim Koopmann Software	2002	2.9			Proprietary
Photos	Image organizer and basic editor for macOS; replaced iPhoto from OS X 10.10.3 onwards	Apple Inc.	2014	1.0	2021		Proprietary
Picasa*	Efficient image organizer with basic editing tools, other image effects	Google	2002	3.9.141.259	October 9, 2015 (dead/discontinued)	Freeware	Proprietary
Pinta	Mid-level Free and Open Source raster graphics editor, based on Paint.Net	Jonathan Pobst	February 7, 2010	3.1.2	2026-04-02	Free	MIT
Pixelmator	Image editor and graphics creator for macOS	Pixelmator Team ltd.	September 25, 2007	3.9	November 13, 2019		Proprietary
Pixia	Originally designed for Anime/Manga art.	Isao Maruoka	1998	6.50s	March 28, 2021		Proprietary
Pixlr	Free online photo editor which includes some paid and ai features	Ola Sevandersson	2008	?	?	Freeware	Proprietary
PMview	Fast image viewer with basic editing functions	Peter Nielsen	1992	3.82	February 24, 2020		Proprietary
Project Dogwaffle	Dan Ritchie retired but others continue active development	Dan Ritchie	1997	V14 (1.2 available as freeware)	2021		Proprietary
QFX	Mature and complete image editing package	Ron Scott	1990	8	? (dead/discontinued)		Proprietary
Rawstudio	Raw image processor.	Anders Brander & Anders Kvist	June 22, 2006	2.0	2017-04-14	Free	GPL-2.0-or-later
RawTherapee	Powerful free and cross-platform raw image editor, for developing raw photos from digital cameras.	Gabor Horvath	September 21, 2006	5.12	2025-05-28	Free	GPL-3.0-or-later
Seashore	Basic counterpart to GIMP, using its XCF format; full support for a few graphics formats	Mark Pazolli	January 16, 2003	2.5.10	December 20, 2020	Free	GPL-2.0-only
Serif PhotoPlus	Complete editor and photo organizer suite; similar features and menus to other software from Serif; available as economy version or in bundle with clipart, effects, public domain image library; made for easy use	Serif	1999	X8	August 10, 2015		Proprietary
Shotwell	Image organizer for GNOME	Yorba Foundation	June 26, 2009	0.30.10	May 22, 2020	Free	LGPL-2.1-or-later
Tux Paint	Drawing program for young children.	Bill Kendrick	June 16, 2002	0.9.35	2025-05-26	Free	GPL-2.0-or-later
TVPaint	2D animation software	Herve ADAM	June 16, 1991	11.5.0	December 1, 2020		Proprietary
UFRaw	Raw image format processor, GTK 2, compatible with gimp 2.0 to 2.8 (2.10 incompatible), see also NUFRaw 0.43	Udi Fuchs		0.22	2015-06-17	Free	GPL-2.0-or-later
Ulead PhotoImpact*		Ulead Systems		13	2008		Proprietary
WinImages	Animation-centric	Black Belt Systems	1985	7.5	2004 (dead/discontinued)	Freeware	Proprietary
Xara Photo & Graphic Designer	Graphic design program including photo editing and vector illustration tools	Xara	1995 (Windows)	October 2018	October 1, 2018		Proprietary
XnView Classic	Image viewer, editor, organizer and batch processor	Pierre-emmanuel Gougelet	1997	2.52.5	March 4, 2026	Freeware	Proprietary
XnView MP	Image viewer, editor, organizer and batch processor	Pierre-emmanuel Gougelet	October 17, 2008	1.11.4	June 26, 2026	Freeware	Proprietary
Zoner Photo Studio	All-in-one editor package	Zoner Inc.		19.2103	March 26, 2021		Proprietary
Program	Description	Creator	First public release date	Latest stable version	Latest stable release date	List price (USD)	Software license

== Operating system support ==
The operating systems on which the editors can run natively, that is, without emulation, virtual machines or compatibility layers. In other words, the software must be specifically coded for the operation system; for example, Adobe Photoshop for Windows running on Linux with Wine does not fit.

Program	Windows	macOS	Linux	iOS	BSD	Unix	AmigaOS	Other
Ability Photopaint	Yes	No	No		No	No	No	No
ACD Canvas	Yes	Yes (Note: Canvas X for Mac was dropped with the release of Canvas 11 in 2007, a Canvas for Mac program was reinstated in 2015 as Canvas Draw.)	No		No	No	No	No
ACDSee	Yes	Yes	No		No	No	No	No
Acorn Image Editor	No	Yes	No		No	No	No	No
Adobe Fireworks*	Yes	Yes	No		No	No	No	No
Adobe Photoshop	Yes	Yes	No	Yes (iPad)	No	No	No	No
Adobe Photoshop Lightroom	Yes	Yes	No		No	No	No	No
Affinity Photo	Yes	Yes	No	Yes (iPad)	No	No	No	No
Aperture	No	Yes (Note: Discontinued after the release of 3.6 in 2014 for OS-X 10.10 Yosemite.)	No		No	No	No	No
Autodesk SketchBook Pro	Yes	Yes	No	Yes	No	No	No	Android
Artipic	Yes	Yes	No		No	No	No	No
ArtRage	Yes	Yes	No	Yes	No	No	No	Android
Artweaver	Yes	No	No		No	No	No	No
Bibble*	Yes	Yes	Yes		No	No	No	No
Bloom Image Editor	Yes	Yes	Yes		No	No	No	No
Brush Strokes Image Editor	Yes	No	No		No	No	No	No
Capture One	Yes	Yes	No		No	No	No	No
Chasys Draw IES	Yes	No	No		No	No	No	No
CinePaint	Version 0.17 only	Yes	Yes		Yes	Yes	No	No
CodedColor PhotoStudio Pro	Yes	No	No		No	No	No	No
Corel PaintShop Pro	Yes	No	No		No	No	No	No
Corel Painter	Yes	Yes	No		No	No	No	No
Corel Photo-Paint	Yes	No	No		No	No	No	No
darktable	Yes	Yes	Yes		Yes	No	No	Solaris
Deluxe Paint*	No	No	No		No	No	Yes	Atari ST, DOS (Note: Deluxe Paint runs on only AmigaOS, Atari ST, and DOS.)
DigiKam	Yes	Yes	Yes		Yes	Yes	No	No
Erdas Imagine	Yes	No	No		No	Yes	No	No
Fatpaint	Yes	Yes	Yes		No	No	No	No
Fotografix	Yes	No	No		No	No	No	No
F-Spot	No	No	Yes		Yes	No	No	No
G'MIC	Yes	Yes	Yes		Yes	Yes	No	No
GIMP	Yes	Yes	Yes	No	Yes	Yes	Needs X11 Cygnix	SkyOS
GimPhoto	Yes	Yes	Yes		No	No	No	No
GIMPshop	Yes	Yes	Yes		Yes	Yes	No	No
GNU Paint	No	No	Yes		Yes	No	No	No
GrafX2	Yes	Yes	Yes		Yes	Yes	Yes	Haiku, MiNT, DOS
GraphicConverter	No	Yes	No		No	No	No	No
GraphicsMagick	Yes	Yes	Yes		Yes	No	No	No
gThumb	No	No	Yes		Yes	No	No	No
HDR PhotoStudio	Yes	Yes	No		No	No	No	No
Helicon Filter	Yes	No	No		No	No	No	No
ImageJ	Yes	Yes	Yes		Yes	No	No	No
ImageMagick	Yes	Yes	Yes		Yes	No	No	No
iPhoto*	No	Yes	No		No	No	No	No
IrfanView	Yes	No	No		No	No	No	No
Iridient Developer	No	Yes	No		No	No	No	No
Kolourpaint	Yes	No	Yes		Yes	Yes	No	No
Krita	Yes	Yes	Yes		Yes	Yes	No	No
LazPaint	Yes	Yes	Yes		No	No	No	No
LiveQuartz	No	Yes	No		No	No	No	No
MacPaint*	No	No	No		No	No	No	Mac OS (Note: MacPaint was developed for the classic Mac OS.)
Microsoft Office Picture Manager*	Yes	Yes	No		No	No	No	No
Microsoft Paint	Yes	No	No		No	No	No	No
Microsoft Photo Editor*	Yes	No	No		No	No	No	No
mtPaint	Yes	Yes	Yes	No	Yes	Yes	No	No
MyPaint	Yes	Yes	Yes		Yes	Yes	No	No
OpenCanvas	Yes	No	No		No	No	No	No
Paint.NET	Yes	No	Partial (Note: Limited support using Mono)		No	No	No	No
Paint Tool SAI	Yes	No	No	No	No	No	No	No
PC Paintbrush*	No	No	No		No	No	No	DOS (Note: PC Paintbrush runs on only DOS.)
Pencil2D	Yes	Yes	Yes		Yes	No	No	No
Phatch	Yes	Yes	Yes		Yes	No	No	No
Photogenics	Yes	No	Yes		No	No	Up to version 5	Pocket PC
PhotoLine	Yes	Yes	No		No	No	No	ATARI ST
Photopea	Yes	Yes	Yes					
PhotoPerfect*	Yes	No	No		No	No	No	No
Photos	No	Yes	No		No	No	No	No
Picasa*	Yes	Yes	Up to version 3.0		No	No	No	No
Pinta	Yes	Yes	Yes		Yes	Yes	No	No
Pixelmator	No	Yes	No		No	No	No	No
Pixia	Yes	No	No		No	No	No	No
Pixlr	Yes	Yes	Yes					
PMview	Yes	No	No		No	No	No	OS/2
Project Dogwaffle	Yes	No	No		No	No	No	No
QFX	Yes	No	No		No	No	No	DOS 3.3 and up
Rawstudio	No	Yes	Yes		Yes	No	No	No
RawTherapee	Yes	Yes	Yes		No	No	No	No
Seashore	No	Yes	No		No	No	No	No
Serif PhotoPlus	Yes	No	No		No	No	No	No
Shotwell	No	No	Yes		Yes	No	No	No
Tux Paint	Yes	Yes	Yes		Yes	Yes	No	No
TVPaint	Yes	Yes	Yes		No	No	Up to version 3.59 (Note: Linux version is available as freeware.)	No
UFRaw	Yes	Yes	Yes		Yes	No	No	No
Ulead PhotoImpact*	Yes	No	No		No	No	No	No
WinImages	Yes	No	No		No	No	No	No
Xara Photo & Graphic Designer	Yes	No	No		No	No	No	No
XnView Classic	Yes	No	No		No	No	No	No
XnView MP	Yes	Yes	Yes		No	No	No	No
Zoner Photo Studio	Yes	No	No		No	No	No	No
Program	Windows	macOS	Linux	iOS	BSD	Unix	AmigaOS	Other

== Features ==
Program	Selection editing	Layers	Alpha channel	Histogram	Scripting	HDR	Retouching	Resizing	Noise removal	Lens correction	Sized printing	Sharpening	Color correction	Image library	Plug-in support (Note: External plug-ins may allow the program to perform some tasks, such as noise reduction or lens distortion, that could not otherwise be done.)	Non-destructive editing
Ability Photopaint	Yes	Yes	?	Yes	Yes	No	?	Yes	?	?	?	?	?	?	?	?
ACD Canvas	Yes	Yes	?	Yes	Yes	No	Yes	Yes	Yes	Yes	?	Yes	?	Yes	No	?
ACDSee (Win)	Yes	Yes	?	Yes	No	No	Yes	Yes	Yes	Yes	?	Yes	Yes	Yes	No	Partial
Acorn Image Editor	Yes	Yes	?	Yes	Yes	No	Yes	Yes	Yes	No	?	Yes	Yes	No	Yes	Yes
Adobe Fireworks*	Yes	Yes	?	Yes	Yes	No	Yes	Yes	Yes	No	Yes	Yes	Yes	Yes	Yes	?
Adobe Photoshop	Yes	Yes	Yes	Yes	Yes	Yes	Yes	Yes	Yes	Yes	Yes	Yes	Yes	Yes (Through Mini Bridge)	Yes	Partial
Adobe Photoshop Lightroom	Yes	No	?	Yes	No	Yes	Yes	Yes	Yes	Yes	Yes	Yes	Yes	Yes	Yes	Yes
Affinity Photo	Yes	Yes	Yes	Yes	No	Yes	Yes	Yes	Yes	Yes	Yes	Yes	Yes	No	Yes	Yes
Aperture	Yes	Partial	?	Yes	Yes	No	Yes	Yes	Yes	Yes	Yes	Yes	Yes	Yes	Yes	Yes
Autodesk SketchBook Pro	Yes	Yes	Yes	No	No	No	No	Yes	No	No	Yes	No	No	No	No	Yes
Artipic	Yes	Yes	?	Yes	No	No	Yes	Yes	No	No	Yes	Yes	Yes	No	No	Yes
ArtRage	Yes	Yes	Yes	No	Yes	No	Yes	Yes	Yes	No	Yes	No	No	?	?	?
Artweaver	Yes	Yes	?	No	Via plug-in	No	Yes	Yes	Yes	?	?	Yes	Yes	No	Yes	?
Bibble*	Partial	Partial	?	Yes	No	No	Yes	Yes	Yes	Yes	Yes	Yes	Yes	Yes	Yes	?
Bloom Image Editor	Yes	Yes	?	Yes	No	Yes	Yes	Yes	No	Yes	No	Yes	Yes	No	No	Yes
Brush Strokes Image Editor	Yes	No	?	No	No	No	Yes	Yes	Yes	Yes	Yes	Yes	Yes	Yes	Yes	?
Capture One	Yes	Yes	?	Yes	Yes	Yes	Yes	Yes	Yes	Yes	Yes	Yes	Yes	Yes	Yes	Yes
Chasys Draw IES	Yes	Yes	Yes	Yes	Yes	Partial	Yes	Yes	Yes	Yes	Yes	Yes	Yes	No	Yes	Yes
CinePaint	Yes	Yes	?	Yes	Yes	Yes	Yes	Yes	No	No	Yes	Yes	Yes	No	Yes	?
CodedColor PhotoStudio Pro	Yes	Yes	?	Yes	No	?	?	?	?	?	?	?	?	?	?	?
Corel PaintShop Pro	Yes	Yes	Yes	Yes	Yes	Yes	Yes	Yes	Yes	Yes	Yes	Yes	Yes	Yes	Yes	?
Corel Painter	Yes	Yes	Yes	No	Yes	No	Yes	Yes	Yes	?	?	Yes	Yes	?	Yes	?
Corel Photo-Paint	Yes	Yes	?	Yes	Yes	Yes	Yes	Yes	Yes	Yes	Yes	Yes	Yes	Yes	Yes	?
darktable	No	No	?	Yes	Yes	Yes	Yes	Yes	Yes	Yes	No	Yes	Yes	Yes	No	Yes
Deluxe Paint*	No	Partial (Note: There are two: the main page and the swap page.)	?	Partial	Yes	No	Yes	Yes	No	No	?	No	No	?	No	?
DigiKam	No	No	?	Yes	Yes	No	No	Yes	Yes	Yes	Yes	Yes	Yes	Yes	Yes	Yes
Erdas Imagine	Yes	Yes	?	Yes	Yes	Yes	Yes	Yes	Yes	No	Yes	Yes	Yes	No	Yes	?
Fatpaint	Yes	Yes	?	Yes	No	No	Yes	Yes	No	No	Yes	Yes	Yes	Yes	No	?
Fotografix	No	No	?	No	No	No	?	Yes	No	No	No	Yes	Yes	No	No	Yes
GIMP	Yes	Yes	Yes	Yes	Yes	2.10+	Yes	Yes	Yes	Yes	Yes	Yes	Yes	No	Yes	3.0+
GIMPshop	Yes	Yes	Yes	Yes	Yes	No	Yes	Yes	Yes	Yes	Yes	Yes	Yes	No	Yes	?
GraphicConverter	Yes	Partial	?	Yes	Yes	No	Yes	Yes	Yes	Via plug-in	Yes	Yes	Yes	Yes	Yes	?
HDR PhotoStudio	No	No	?	No	Yes	Yes	Yes	Yes	Yes	No	No	Yes	Yes	No	Yes	?
Helicon Filter	Partial	No (Note: Helicon Filter does not implement layers, but it can insert frames and editable text, and objects from one photo can be brushed into the main photo.)	?	Yes	No (Note: Although Helicon Filter does not support actual scripting, it is capable of storing and reusing sequences and settings of edits.)	Yes	Yes	Yes	Yes	Yes	Yes	Yes	Yes	No	Yes	?
iPhoto*	No	No	?	Yes	Partial (Note: iPhoto can be scripted using Automator and AppleScript.)	No	Yes	Partial	Yes	Partial	Yes	Yes	Yes	Yes	Yes	Yes
IrfanView	Yes	No	?	Yes	No	No	Via plug-in	Yes	No	No	?	Yes	Yes	?	Yes	?
Iridient Developer	?	Yes	?	Yes	?	Yes	Yes	Yes	Yes	Yes	Yes	Yes	Yes	Yes	Yes	Yes
Kolourpaint	Yes	No	?	No	No	No	?	?	?	?	?	?	?	?	?	?
Krita	Yes	Yes	Yes	Yes	Yes	Yes	Yes	Yes	Yes	Yes	No	Yes	Yes	No	Yes	Yes
LazPaint	Yes	Yes	Yes	Partial	Yes	No	Yes	Yes	No	No	No	Partial	Partial	No	No	Partial
LiveQuartz	Yes	Yes	?	No	No	No	Yes	Yes	Yes	No	?	Yes	Yes	No	No	Partial
MacPaint*	Yes	No	?	No	No	No	?	?	?	?	?	?	?	?	?	?
Microsoft Office Picture Manager*	Partial	No	?	No	No	No	No	Yes	No	No	Yes	No	?	No	No	?
Microsoft Paint	No	Yes	Yes	No	No	No	Partial	Yes	No	No	No	No	No	No	No	No
Microsoft Photo Editor*	Yes	No	?	No	No	No	No	Yes	Yes	No	Yes	Yes	Yes	No	No	?
mtPaint	Yes	Yes	Yes	No	Yes	No	?	Yes	No	No	No	Yes	Yes	No	No	Yes
OpenCanvas	Yes	Yes	?	Yes	No	?	Yes	Yes	No	No	Yes	Yes	Yes	No	?	?
Paint.NET	Yes	Yes	?	Yes	Partial	No	Yes	Yes	Yes	No	Yes	Yes	Yes	No	Yes	No
Paint Tool SAI	Yes	Yes	Yes	No	No	No	No	Yes	No	No	No	No	No	No	No	No
PC Paintbrush*	Yes	No	?	No	No	No	?	?	?	?	?	?	?	?	?	?
Photogenics	Yes	Yes	?	Yes	?	Yes	?	?	?	?	?	?	?	?	?	?
PhotoLine	Yes	Yes	Yes	Yes	Yes	Yes	Yes	Yes	Yes	Yes	Yes	Yes	Yes	Yes	Yes	Yes
PhotoPerfect*	Yes	No	?	Yes	Yes	Yes	Yes	Yes	Yes	Yes	Yes	Yes	Yes	?	Yes	?
Photos	No	No	?	Yes	Partial (Note: Photos can be scripted using Automator and AppleScript.)	No	Yes	Partial	Yes	Partial	Yes	Yes	Yes	Yes	Yes	Yes
Picasa*	No	No	?	Yes	No	Partial (Note: If images are perfectly aligned, Picasa can create a Multi-Exposure Collage which effectively makes a simple HDR with little customization, though brightness has to be corrected afterwards with no bit depth increase.)	Partial	Partial	No	No	Yes	Yes	Yes	Yes	No	Yes
Pixelmator	Yes	Yes	?	Yes	Yes	No	Yes	Yes	Yes	Yes	Yes	Yes	Yes	No	Yes	No
Pixia	Yes	Yes	?	Yes	No	No	Yes	Yes	Yes	No	Yes	Yes	?	?	Yes	?
Project Dogwaffle	?	Commercial version	?	Yes	Partial	No	Yes	Yes	?	?	?	Yes	Yes	?	Yes	?
QFX	Yes	Yes	?	Yes	Yes	?	?	?	?	?	?	?	?	?	Yes	?
RawTherapee	No	No	?	Yes	Yes	No	Yes	Yes	Yes	Yes	Yes	Yes	Yes	Yes	No	Yes
Serif PhotoPlus	Yes	Yes	?	Yes	No	No	Yes	Yes	Yes	No	Yes	Yes	Yes	Yes	No	?
Side Effects Houdini	Yes	Yes	?	Yes	Yes	No	Yes	Yes	Yes	No	?	Yes	Yes	No	Yes	?
Tux Paint	No	No	?	No	No	No	No	No	No	No	No	Yes	No	No	Yes	?
TVPaint	Yes	Yes	?	Yes	Yes	No	Yes	Yes	?	?	?	?	Yes	?	Yes	?
Ulead PhotoImpact*	Yes	Yes	?	Yes	No	Yes	Yes	Yes	Yes	Yes	Yes	Yes	Yes	Yes	Yes	?
WinImages	Yes	Yes	?	?	Yes	?	?	?	?	?	?	?	?	?	?	?
Xara Photo & Graphic Designer	Yes	Yes	?	Yes	No	No	Yes	Yes	Yes	Partial	Yes	Yes	Yes	Yes	Yes	Yes
XnView Classic and MP	Partial	Partial	Yes	Yes	Yes	No	No	Yes	Yes	?	Yes	Yes	Yes	Yes	Yes	No
Zoner Photo Studio	Yes	Partial (Note: Zoner Photo Studio 11 supports one temporary layer.)	?	Yes	No (Note: Zoner Photo Studio does not actually support scripting, but it can store and reuse sequences of filters with preset parameters (Batch Filter).)	Yes	Yes	Yes	Yes	Yes	Yes	Yes	Yes	Yes	Yes	?

== Color spaces ==
Program	sRGB	Adobe RGB (1998)	Indexed	Grayscale	CMYK	LAB	HSV
Ability Photopaint	Yes	?	Yes	Yes	Import only		
ACD Canvas	Yes	?	Yes	Yes	Yes		
ACDSee (Win)	Yes	Yes	Yes	Yes	No	No	No
Acorn Image Editor	Yes	Yes	Import only	Import only	Yes	Import only	Import only
Adobe Fireworks*	Yes	Yes	Yes	Yes	Yes	No	Yes
Adobe Photoshop	Yes	Yes	Yes	Yes	Yes	Yes	Yes
Adobe Photoshop Lightroom	Yes	Yes	?	Yes	Import only	?	?
Affinity Photo	Yes	Yes	Yes	Yes	Yes	Yes	Yes
Autodesk SketchBook Pro	Yes	?	Yes	No	No		
Artipic	Yes	Yes	Yes	Import only	Import only	Import only	Import only
ArtRage	Yes	?	No	No	No		
Artweaver	Yes	?	?	?	?		
Bibble*	Yes	Yes	?	Yes	?	?	?
Brush Strokes Image Editor	Yes	?	?	?	?		
Capture One	Yes	Yes	Yes	Yes	Yes	Yes	Yes
Chasys Draw IES	Yes	No	Yes	Yes	Partial	Partial	Partial
CinePaint	Yes	Yes	No	Yes	Yes	Yes	
CodedColor PhotoStudio Pro	Yes	Yes	Yes	Yes	Yes		
Corel PaintShop Pro	Yes	Yes	Yes	Yes	Yes	Partial (Note: Split to channels.)	Partial
Corel Painter	Yes	?	No	No	Yes		
Corel Photo-Paint	Yes	Yes	Yes	Yes	Yes	Yes	
darktable	Yes	Yes	?	?	?	Yes	?
Deluxe Paint*	Yes	?	Yes	Yes	No		Yes
Erdas Imagine	Yes	Yes	Yes	Yes	Yes	No	Yes
Fatpaint	Yes	No	Partial	Partial	Partial	No	Partial
Fotografix	Yes	No	Import only	Import only	No	No	Yes
GIMP	Yes	Yes	Yes	Yes	Partial	2.10+	Yes
GIMPshop	Yes	Yes	Yes	Yes	Partial	No	Yes
GrafX2	No	No	Yes	No	No	No	No
GraphicConverter	Yes	Yes	Yes	Yes	Yes		
Helicon Filter	Yes	Yes	?	Yes	Yes		
iPhoto*	Yes	Yes	No	Yes	Yes	Yes	Yes
IrfanView	Yes	?	Yes	Yes	No		
Iridient Developer	Yes	Yes	Yes	Yes	Yes	Yes	Yes
Kolourpaint	Yes	?	No	Yes	No		
Krita	Yes	Yes	No	Yes	Yes	Yes	Yes
MacPaint*	No	No	No	Yes	No		
Microsoft Office Picture Manager*	Yes	?	?	?	No		
Microsoft Paint	Yes	?	Import only	No	No	No	No
Microsoft Photo Editor*	Yes	?	Yes	Yes	No		
mtPaint	Yes	Import only	Yes	Yes	Import only	No	Yes
OpenCanvas	Yes	?	?	Yes	No		
Paint.NET	Yes	No	Partial	Partial	Partial	No	Partial
Paint Tool SAI	Yes	No	?	Yes	?	?	?
PC Paintbrush*	No	?	Yes	No	No		
Photogenics	Yes	Yes	Yes	Yes	Yes		
PhotoLine	Yes	Yes	Yes	Yes	Yes	Yes	Yes
PhotoPerfect*	Yes	Import only	No	Yes	Import only	Curve editing only	No
Photos	Yes	Yes	No	Yes	Yes	Yes	Yes
Picasa*	Yes	?	Partial	Partial	No		
Pixelmator	Yes	Yes	Yes	No	No	No	No
Pixia	Yes	?	No	No	No		
Project Dogwaffle	Yes	?	No	No	No		
QFX	Yes	Yes	Yes	Yes	Yes		
RawTherapee	Yes	Yes	No	Yes	No	Yes	Yes
Seashore	Yes	Yes	?	Yes	Yes	?	?
Serif PhotoPlus	Yes	Yes	?	Yes	Yes	?	?
Tux Paint	Yes	No	No	No	No	No	No
TVPaint	Yes	?	No	No	No		
Ulead PhotoImpact*	Yes	Yes	Yes	Yes	Import only	No	Yes
WinImages	Yes	?	?	?	Yes		Yes
Xara Photo & Graphic Designer	Yes	Partial	Partial	Partial	Partial	Partial	Partial
XnView Classic and MP	Yes	Yes	Yes	Yes	Partial	Partial	Partial
Zoner Photo Studio	Yes	Yes	Yes	Yes	Partial	Partial	No
Program	sRGB	Adobe RGB (1998)	Indexed	Grayscale	CMYK	LAB	HSV

== File support ==
Program	TGA	RAW imports	BMP	GIF	JPEG	JPEG 2000	JPEG XR	PNG	TIFF	PSD	PSP	XCF	PCX	ORA	HEIF	JPEG XL	WebP	AVIF	Netpbm	HDR
Ability Photopaint	?	?	Yes	Yes	Yes	No	?	Yes	Yes	Yes	No	No	?	?	?					
ACD Canvas	?	?	Yes	Yes	Yes	No	?	Yes	Yes	Yes	Yes	No	?	?	?					
ACDSee (Win)	?	Yes	Yes	Yes	Yes	Yes	No	Yes	Yes	Yes	Yes	?	?	?	?					
Acorn Image Editor	Yes	Yes	Yes	Yes	Yes	Yes	No	Yes	Yes	Yes	No	No	?	No	Yes	Yes	Yes	Import only	No	?
Adobe Fireworks*	No	No	Yes	Yes	Yes	Yes	No	Yes	Yes	Yes	No	No	No	No	No	No	No	No	No	No
Adobe Photoshop	Yes	Yes	Yes	Yes	Yes	Via plug-in (Note: Photoshop requires an optional plug-in from the installation disc to support JPEG 2000.)	Yes	Yes	Yes	Yes	No	No	Yes	No	Yes	Yes	Yes	Import only	Yes	Yes
Adobe Photoshop Lightroom	?	Yes	No	Via plug-in	Yes	Via plug-in	No	Via plug-in	Yes	Partial (Note: To import and work with a multi-layered PSD file in Lightroom, the file must be saved in Photoshop with the Maximize PSD and PSB File Compatibility preference turned on.)	?	?	?	?	?					
Affinity Photo	Yes	Yes	No	Yes	Yes	No	Import only	Yes	Yes	Yes	No	No	No	No	Yes	Yes	Yes	No	No	Yes
Autodesk SketchBook Pro	?	?	Yes	Yes	Yes	Yes	?	Yes	Yes	Yes	No	No	No	?	?					
Artipic	?	Yes	Yes	Yes	Yes	Yes	?	Yes	Yes	Partial	No	No	Yes	?	?					
ArtRage	?	?	Yes	Yes	Yes	No	?	Yes	Yes	Yes	No	No	?	?	?					
Artweaver	?	No	Yes	Yes	Yes	Partial	?	Yes	Yes	Partial	No	No	Yes	?	?					
Bibble*	?	Yes	No	No	Yes	No	No	No	Yes	No	No	No	No	?	?					
Brush Strokes Image Editor	?	?	Yes	Yes	Yes	No		Yes	Yes	No	No	No	?							
Capture One	?	Yes	Yes	Yes	Yes	Yes		Yes	Yes	Yes	?	?	?							
Chasys Draw IES	Yes	Yes	Yes	Yes	Yes	Yes	Yes	Yes	Yes	Yes	Yes	Yes	Yes	Yes	Yes					
CinePaint	?	Yes	Yes	Yes	Yes	No		Yes	Yes	Partial	No	Yes	?							
CodedColor PhotoStudio Pro	?	?	Yes	Yes	Yes	Yes		Yes	Yes	Yes	No	No	Yes							
Corel PaintShop Pro	?	Yes	Yes	Yes	Yes	Yes		Yes	Yes	Partial (Note: No layer modes support.)	Yes	No	Yes							
Corel Painter	?	?	Yes	Yes	Yes	No		No	Yes (Note: Corel Painter does not support TIFF with LZW compression.)	Yes	Yes	No	Import only							
Corel Photo-Paint	?	Yes	Yes	Yes	Yes	Yes		Yes	Yes	Yes	Yes	No	Yes							
darktable	?	Yes	No	No	Yes	Yes	No	Yes	Yes	No	No	No	No							
Deluxe Paint* (Note: Deluxe Paint can load and save only IFF ILBM file format.)	No	No	No	No	No	No	No	No	No	No	No	No	No	No	No	No	No	No	No	No
DigiKam	?	Yes	Yes	Yes	Yes	Yes		Yes	Yes	No	No	Yes	?							
Erdas Imagine	?	Yes	Yes	Yes	Yes	Yes	No	Yes	Yes	No	No	No	Import only							
Fatpaint	?	No	No	No	Yes	No	No	Yes	No	No	No	No	No							
Fotografix	No	Yes	Yes	Yes	Yes	Yes	?	Yes	Yes	No	No	No	No							
GIMP	Yes	Yes	Yes	Yes	Yes	Yes (Note: Native support added in version 2.8)	Via plug-in	Yes	Yes	Yes	Yes	Yes	Yes	Yes	Yes	Partial	Yes	Yes	Yes	Yes
GIMPshop	?	?	Yes	Yes	Yes	No	No	Yes	Yes	Yes	Yes	Yes	Yes							
GrafX2	?	No	Yes	Yes	Import only	No	No	Yes	Yes	No	No	No	Yes							
GraphicConverter	?	Partial (Note: Many RAW images can be imported, but are reduced to 8 bits per color channel.)	Yes	Yes	Yes	Yes	No	Yes	Yes	Yes	Yes	Yes (Note: GraphicConverter requires macOS or later with installed Image Magick application of the Fink package or any other distribution in order to support XCF.)	Yes							
HDR PhotoStudio	?	Yes	Yes	No	Yes	No	No	No	Yes	No	No	No	No							
Helicon Filter	?	Yes	Yes	Import only	Yes	Yes	No	Yes	Yes	Yes	No	No	No							
ImageMagick	Yes	Yes	Yes	Yes	Yes	Yes	Yes	Yes	Yes	Yes	No	Yes	Yes	Yes	Yes	Yes	Yes	Yes	Yes	Yes
iPhoto*	?	Yes	?	?	Yes	?	No	Yes	Yes	Yes	?	?	Yes							
IrfanView	Yes	Via plug-in	Yes	Yes	Yes	Via plug-in	Via plug-in	Yes	Yes	Yes	Yes	Via plug-in	Yes	No	?	Yes	Yes	Yes	Yes	No
Iridient Developer	?	Yes	Yes	Yes	Yes	Yes		Yes	Yes	Yes	?	?	?							
Kolourpaint	?	?	Yes	Yes	Yes	Yes	No	Yes	Yes	No	No	Import only	Yes							
Krita	Yes	Yes	Yes	Yes	Yes	Yes	No	Yes	Yes	Yes	No	Yes	Import only	Yes	Yes	Yes	Yes	Yes	Yes	?
LiveQuartz	?	Partial	Yes	Yes	Yes	Yes	No	Yes	Yes	Partial	?	?	?	?	Yes					
LazPaint	Yes	Yes	Yes	Yes	Yes	No	No	Yes	Yes	Import	No	No	Yes	Yes	No					
MacPaint*	?	No	?	No	No	No	No	No	No	No	No	No	No							
Microsoft Office Picture Manager*	?	?	Yes	Yes	Yes	No		Yes	First page only (Note: Microsoft Office Picture Manager and Paint.NET only support TIFF for viewing and editing of the first page.)	No	No	No	Yes							
Microsoft Paint	?	No	Yes	Partial (Note: MS Paint does not support transparency in GIF or PNG.)	Yes	No	No	Partial	Yes	No	No	No	No							
Microsoft Photo Editor*	?	No	Yes	Yes	Yes	No		Yes	No	No	No	No	Import only							
mtPaint	Yes	No	Yes	Yes	Yes	Yes	No	Yes	Yes	No	No	No	Yes	No	No					
OpenCanvas	?	?	Yes	No	Yes	No	No	Yes	No	Yes (Note: PSD is supported only in openCanvas 4 Plus, not regular openCanvas 4.)	No	No	?							
Paint.NET	Yes	Yes	Yes	Yes	Yes	Yes	Yes (Note: Paint.NET 3.08 supports import/export of images in HD Photo lossy & lossless format via a file-type plug-in based on a Microsoft HD Photo specification; it expires on September 1, 2007 or if the Paint.NET version is 3.20 or higher. The developers hope tentatively plan to implement full HD Photo support by version 3.20.)	Yes	Via plug-ins	Partial	No	Via plug-ins	Yes	No	Yes	Yes	Yes	Yes	No	No
Paint Tool SAI	Yes	No	Yes	No	Yes	?	No	Yes	No	Yes	No	No	No	No	No					
PC Paintbrush*	?	?	No	Yes	No	No		No	Yes	No	No	No	Yes							
Photogenics	?	?	Yes	Yes	Yes	?		Yes	Yes	Yes	?	?	Yes							
PhotoLine	Yes	Yes	Yes	Yes	Yes	Yes	Yes	Yes	Yes	Yes	Yes	Import only	Yes	No	Yes	Yes	Yes	Yes	Import only	Yes
PhotoPerfect*	?	Yes	Yes	No	Yes	Yes	No	Yes	Yes	No layer support	Yes	No	Yes							
Photos	?	Yes	?	?	Yes	?	No	Yes	Yes	Yes	?	?	Yes							
Picasa*	?	Yes	Import only	Import only	Yes	No		Import only	No	Import only	No	No	No							
Pixelmator	?	Yes	Yes	Yes	Yes	Yes	No	Yes	Yes	Yes	No	Yes	Yes							
Pixia	?	?	Yes	No	Yes	No		Yes	Yes	Yes	No	No	No							
PMview	?	No	Yes	Yes	Yes	No	No	Yes	Yes	Yes	No	No	Yes							
Project Dogwaffle	?	?	Yes	No	Yes	No		No	Yes	No	No	No	No							
QFX	?	?	Yes	Yes	Yes	No	No	?	Yes	Yes	No	No	?							
RawTherapee	?	Yes	Yes	No	Yes	No	No	Yes	Yes	No	No	No	No							
Seashore	?	No	Partial	Partial	Yes	Partial		Yes	Yes	No	?	Yes	?							
Serif PhotoPlus	?	Yes	Yes	Yes	Yes	Yes	Yes	Yes	Yes	Yes	Yes	No	Yes							
Tux Paint (Note: For the BMP, JPEG and PNG formats, the user is sandboxed in an interface that does not permit file system interaction, including viewing of filenames and the choice of a file's name, type, or location. Files are selected by thumbnails, and may only be loaded from one predetermined directory.)	?	No	Yes	Import only	Import only	No	No	Yes	No	No	No	No	No							
TVPaint	?	?	Yes	Yes	Yes	No		Yes	Yes	Yes	No	No	Yes							
Ulead PhotoImpact*	?	Yes	Yes	Yes	Yes	Yes		Yes	Yes	Partial	Import only	No	Yes							
WinImages	?	?	Yes	Yes	Yes	No		Yes	Yes	Yes	No	No	?							
Xara Photo & Graphic Designer	Yes	Yes	Yes	Yes	Yes	Yes	Import only	Yes	Yes	Yes	No	No	Yes	No	No	No	Yes	Yes	Import only	No
XnView Classic	Yes	Yes	Yes	Yes	Yes	Yes	Yes	Yes	Yes	Yes	Yes	Import only	Yes	via plugin	No	No	Yes	Partial	Yes	Import only
XnView MP	Yes	Yes	Yes	Yes	Yes	Yes	Yes	Yes	Yes	Yes	Yes	Import only	Yes	Yes	Yes	Yes	Yes	Yes	Yes	Import only
Zoner Photo Studio	?	Yes	Yes	Yes	Yes	Import only	Yes	Yes	Yes	Import only	Import only	No	Yes							
Program	TGA	RAW imports	BMP	GIF	JPEG	JPEG 2000	JPEG XR	PNG	TIFF	PSD	PSP	XCF	PCX	ORA	HEIF	JPEG XL	WebP	AVIF	Netpbm	HDR

== See also ==
- Raster graphics (also called bitmap)
- Raster graphics editor
- Comparison of graphics file formats
- Vector graphics
- Comparison of raster-to-vector conversion software
- Comparison of vector graphics editors
- Comparison of 3D computer graphics software
- Comparison of image viewers
- List of 2D graphics software
- List of digital art software
