= QFX (disambiguation) =

QFX may refer to:

- QFX (program), a computer image editing program
- QFX (band), a Scottish techno band
- QFX (file format), "Quicken Financial Exchange" file format used by Intuit software
