= Touch Up (disambiguation) =

Touch Up may refer to:

- Touch Up, function in Portrait Professional
- Touch Up, product in Nice 'n Easy (hair coloring)
- Touch Up (Mother Mother album)

== See also ==
- "Touch Me Up", single by Aretha Franklin from Sweet Passion 1977
