= Ormr =

Ormr may refer to:

- Germanic dragon, a being often referred to in Old Norse as an "ormr"
- Bloom Image Editor, formerly known as "Ormr"
- Ormr, a figure in the Old Norse saga Morkinskinna
