= Pinta (software) =

Image editing software

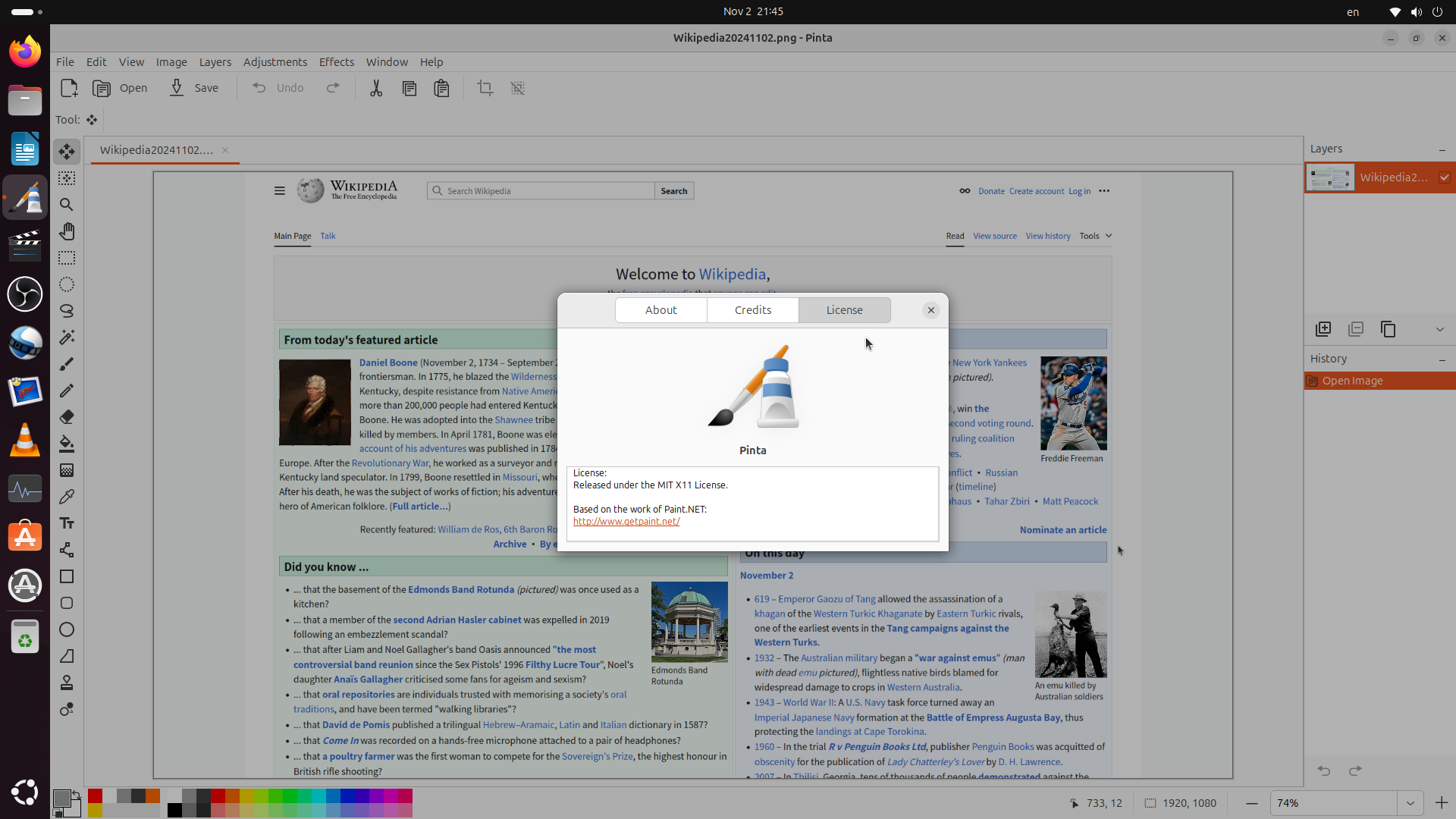
- Pinta running on Ubuntu
- Original author: Jonathan Pobst
- Developers: Cameron White; Robert Nordan; Olivier Dufour
- Release: February 7, 2010; 16 years ago
- Stable release: 3.1.2 / 2 April 2026
- Written in: C# (GTK#)
- Operating system: Linux, Mac OS X, Windows
- Platform: Mono/GNOME
- Size: Windows: 2.5 MB; Ubuntu: 1.4 MB; macOS: 1.6 MB
- Available in: Multilingual (55 languages)
- Type: Raster graphics editor
- License: MIT
- Website: pinta-project.com
- Repository: github.com/PintaProject/Pinta

Pinta is an open-source, cross-platform bitmap image drawing and editing program inspired by Paint.NET, a similar image editing program which is limited to Microsoft Windows. Pinta has more features than Microsoft Paint. Compared with open-source image editor GIMP, Pinta is simpler and has fewer features.

== Features ==
Pinta is a bitmap image editor with many features typical of image editing software including drawing tools, image filters and colour adjustment tools. The focus on usability is reflected in several of the main features of the program:

- Unlimited undo history.
- Multiple language support.
- Flexible toolbar arrangement, including floating as windows or docking around the image edge.

Unlike some simple image editing software, Pinta also features support for image layers.

== History and development ==
Development of Pinta began in February 2010 and was driven by Jonathan Pobst, then working at Novell. The first stable release was in April 2011. In September 2011 Pobst announced that he was no longer interested in developing Pinta. A new group of developers continued the project. Version 1.6 brought improved shape tools and union, exclude, xor, and intersection modes. Version 1.7 was the final release on GTK2. Version 2.0 added a status bar widget, an improved text tool, and various quality-of-life improvements alongside the port to GTK3 which brought various improvements to Wayland support, performance improvements, and better support for HiDPI displays. On April 12, 2025, Pinta 3.0 was released, which brought improvements to the color picker dialog, added various new filters, restored support for add-ins, and other various quality-of-life improvements along with the port to GTK4 and Libadwaita.

Pinta is written in C# and uses the GTK+ toolkit and the cairo library. The code adjustment and effect filters originally came from Paint.NET but otherwise the project is original code.

== See also ==
- Comparison of raster graphics editors
- KolourPaint
- Krita
- MyPaint
