= Microsoft Photo Editor =

Raster graphics editor

- A screenshot of Photo Editor running on Windows XP
- Developer(s): Microsoft
- Stable release: 3.0.2.3 / December 15, 2000; 24 years ago
- Preview release: None
- Operating system: Microsoft Windows
- Type: Raster graphics editor
- License: Proprietary
- Website: support.microsoft.com/kb/169938

Microsoft Photo Editor is a raster graphics editor component of Microsoft Office first included with Microsoft Office 97. It features editing tools to texturize, create negatives, adjust gamma, and add transparency to GIF images. It was replaced in Microsoft Office 2003 by Microsoft Office Picture Manager, although many Photo Editor features (mostly visual effects and tools) were not available in Picture Manager.

== Issues ==
Early versions of Microsoft Photo Editor, including the version bundled with Office 2000, do not preserve metadata from digital camera JPEG images. The Office 2000 version sets the display resolution metadata of BMP files to 0 by 0, regardless of what resolution is set through the program UI.

Version 3.0.2.3 and earlier have a 10 megapixel resolution limit. Large bitmap BMP files can be opened in Microsoft Photo Editor 3.0.2.3, as well as, e.g. a 4000×2578 (10.3 megapixels), 15 MB JPEG image.

Version 3.01 has an issue where, under certain circumstances, the program opens minimized with no way to maximize it. The solution is to delete the "InitialPosition" entry in the following Windows Registry location:

HKEY_CURRENT_USER\Software\Microsoft\Photo Editor\3.0\Microsoft Photo Editor

The following script can be saved as a .reg file to fix the issue in Windows XP and later versions:

Windows Registry Editor Version 5.00

[HKEY_CURRENT_USER\Software\Microsoft\Photo Editor\3.0\Microsoft Photo Editor]
"InitialPosition"=-

== See also ==
- List of raster graphics editors
- Comparison of raster graphics editors
