= Acorn (software) =

Raster graphic editor for macOS

- Developer: Flying Meat Inc.
- Release: September 10, 2007; 19 years ago
- Stable release: 8.7.1 (21 October 2026; 19 days ago) [±]
- Operating system: macOS
- Type: Raster graphics editor
- License: Proprietary
- Website: flyingmeat.com/acorn/

Acorn is a raster graphic editor for macOS developed by August Mueller of Flying Meat Inc, based out of Mukilteo, Washington, United States. Acorn was first released on September 10, 2007 and was built upon the framework of a previous image editing application of Flying Meat Inc., FlySketch.

Acorn makes extensive use of Apple's Core Image framework for its image processing. The native file format of Acorn is .acorn. Acorn combines vector drawing with bitmap editing, and has been described as an alternative to Photoshop. Key features of Acorn include image filters, a custom color picker, a brush designer, and image editing tools such as crop, erase, paint, select, pan, zoom, move, clone, smudge, dodge, and burn.

== Major Features ==
- Layers-based editing
- Layer masks and blending modes
- Multi-layer screenshots
- Nondestructive stackable filters
- Curves and levels
- Multi-stop live gradients
- Scriptable
- Automator support
- Built in brush designer to create custom brushes
- Photoshop brush import
- Vector shapes, Bézier pen tool, and text tools
- Shape processor
- Circle text tool
- RAW image import
- Multiple selection tools including quick mask and magic wand
- Smart layer export
- Web export
- Guides, grids, rulers, and snapping
- Native support for Apple's retina displays
- Color profile management
- Deep color image support
- Documentation online and in ePub format
- Runs on Metal 2

== Version history ==
Version	Initial Release Date	OS Compatibility	Notable Features
1.0 - 1.5.5	September 10, 2007	10.4 - 10.10	Initial release; brush designer, fancy crop, open and save JPEG 2000 images
2.0 - 2.6.5	September 13, 2009	10.6 - 10.10	Layered screenshots, rulers, RAW image support, 64-bit support, touchup tools, JSTalk scripting support, AppleScript support, layer groups, guides and snapping, layer masks, WebP
3.0 - 3.5.2	April 12, 2011	10.6 - 10.10	Layer styles, quick mask, instant alpha, live multi-stop gradients, new filters, add/subtract points on Bézier curves, full screen support, autosave and versions, retina canvas support, smart layer export, web export scaling, new blending modes
4.0 - 4.5.7	May 2, 2013	10.8 - 10.12	Nondestructive stackable filters, curves adjustment, vector line join style, multi-layer selection, save selection with file, CMYK support when saving as JPEG and TIFF, editable image depth, sharing support, soft eraser, live font updates, live blending updates, share extension for Photos
5.0 - 5.6	August 20, 2015	10.10+	Shape processor, nondestructive curves and levels, improved PDF import, Photoshop brush import, image metadata editing, basic SVG support, deep color image support, circle text tool, new color picker, improved color management
6.0 - 6.3.3	July 10, 2017	10.11+	Text on a path, clone tool works across layers and images, new Web Export features, smart layer export settings palette, new Bézier tools, color profiles, make shape from selection
7.0	March 17, 2021	10.14+	Support for Mac computers with Apple silicon, tabbed document interface, new Export window, animated GIF export, perspective fix and crop tool, new color picker, Spotlight-like command bar
8.0	December 16, 2024	14+	

== Reviews and awards ==
- Houston Chronicle Acorn 4 review
- The 25 Best Alternatives to Photoshop
- Macworld Editor's Choice Award 2009
- Mac App Store Best Apps of 2013
- Mac App Store Best Apps of 2015
- 50 Mac Essentials #46
- Acorn 5: Tom's Mac Software Pick
- Clash of the Image Editors: Acorn vs Pixelmator
- Acorn 4 Macworld Review
- Acorn 4 The Verge Review
- 16 Essential Photo Editor Apps

== See also ==
- Comparison of raster graphics editors
- Image editing
