= PhotoPerfect =

Raster graphics editor

- Developers: Arcadia Software AG & Joachim Koopmann Software
- Release: 2002; 24 years ago
- Final release: 3.2
- Operating system: Microsoft Windows
- Type: Bitmap graphics editor
- License: Proprietary
- Website: www.arcadiasoftware.com

PhotoPerfect is a proprietary commercial photo editing software program for Microsoft Windows, published by Arcadia Software AG. The first version was introduced in 2002.

The Arcadia website provides a program manual, tutorials, a user forum, as well as download options for the software — for 14 days of test use.

PhotoPerfect has been discontinued.

== Program features ==
PhotoPerfect is similar to such programs as Adobe Photoshop and the open-source GIMP, unlike these other programs, PhotoPerfect is designed primarily to edit and improve existing photos, and not for graphics creation. Its window can contain several movable subwindows. The main window contains, clockwise: A histogram set, a list of available processing resources, a file directory list, and a thumbnail strip from the selected directory.

The program operations are generally available both in a standard menu system and as icons on optional toolbars. Selecting an image modification option will generally open a window with a tabbed user interface — for selecting within a group of related operations. Each tab will generally contain one or more lever-operated controls, and the tab's image display has a user-operated divider separating the transformed and untransformed versions of the image. The color curves can be controlled (with level limit control) while the resulting histograms are displayed. RAW files can be opened, and TIFF images can be both opened and saved. A special set of 16-bit operations is available for these. Some dynamic range improvement (within 8 bits) may also be achieved by means of the operation Merge Images DRI.

The list of available Processing resources lists the available (built-in and user-supplied) macros, batch processing routines and scripts. PhotoShop-compatible plugins will appear in this list, ready for use, if their .8BF files have been placed in the PhotoPerfect directory.

Extra functions (on the Extras menu) include tools for:

- Slide Show: Combines images for use with a slide show viewer (FFV.exe)
- Mosaic: Transforms an image into a mosaic, using a specified set of mosaic piece images.
- AVI (animation): Creates an AVI movie from a multi-burst image set, or transforms one image into a sequence, e.g. through panning.
- Stereoscopic (3D) image: Generates a 3D image with red & cyan, for viewing with red & cyan glasses.
- Measurements (of lengths, angles, areas and brightness)
- Graphic markers: For placing arrows, circles, squares and polylines (with straight line segments).
- Lens (fringe) correction

Some special image optimizing extensions may be bought separately from Arcadia Software, and they can then be selected from the Image Optimization menu: PerfectlyClear, I2E, Xe847, and these combined by the option Multi-automatic.

== See also ==
Comparison with other graphics editors.
