= Artweaver =

Raster graphics editor

- Developer: Boris Eyrich
- Initial release: September 30, 2009; 16 years ago
- Stable release: 7.0.17 / June 18, 2024; 19 months ago
- Operating system: Microsoft Windows
- Available in: Multilingual
- Type: Raster graphics editor
- License: Freeware / Proprietary software
- Website: www.artweaver.de

Artweaver is a raster graphics editor for Windows developed by Boris Eyrich, mainly oriented to professional and amateur artists who are familiar with commercial programs like Adobe Photoshop and especially Corel Painter.

Like the latter, Artweaver is capable of simulating a wide range of classical effects (such as oil paints, acrylics, pastels, pencils, airbrushes, etc.) to create natural-looking artistic images. It also offers effect filters like sharpen, blur, emboss, and mosaic, as well as transparency and layer support in its own AWD format. Artweaver supports most common file formats, such as BMP, GIF, JPEG, PCX, TGA, TIFF, PNG, PSD, although the BMP, GIF, JPEG, and PNG formats do not have layer support. The program also has standard image editing tools like gradient, crop, fill and selection tools (including lasso and magic wand), and pen tablet support.

Artweaver can also be run in Linux and other Unix-like operating systems using Wine.

Starting with version 1.0 (released September 30, 2009), Artweaver is offered in two different versions: a "Free version", which can be downloaded free of charge, and the "Artweaver Plus" version, which has a cost of €25 and offers more advanced features, like compatibility with Photoshop filters and higher maximum supported image size, among others. However, the split into two different versions implied a change in the terms of use of the "Free" version, as it now cannot be used for commercial purposes.

== See also ==
- Comparison of raster graphics editors
