= Photopea =

Online photo editor

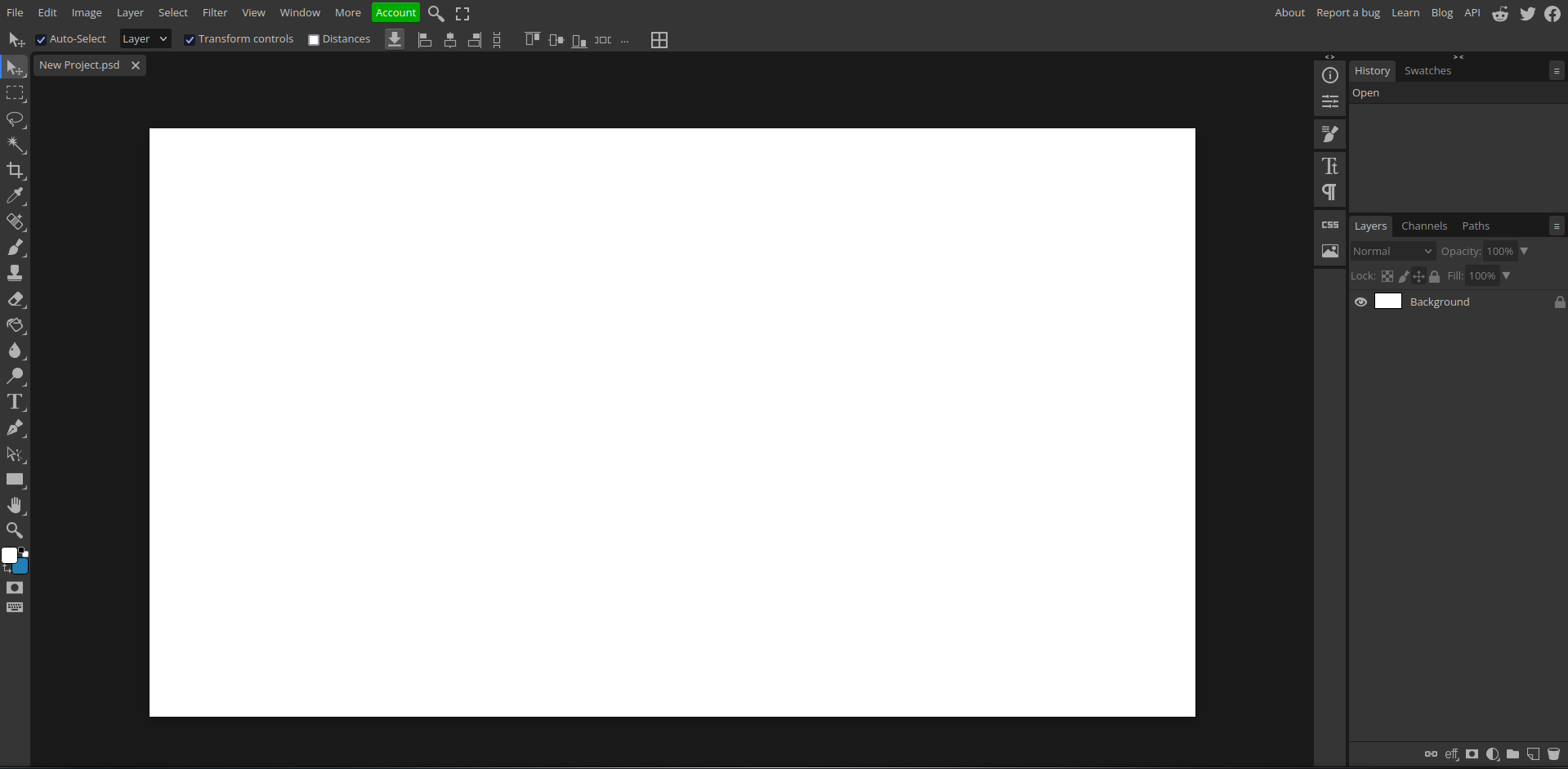
- Photopea 5.6 running in a web browser
- Developer: Ivan Kutskir
- Release: 14 September 2013; 13 years ago
- Stable release: 5.6 / 26 September 2024; 2 years ago
- Written in: JavaScript
- Platform: Web browser
- Available in: 42 languages
- List of languages Albanian, Arabic, Brazilian Portuguese, Bulgarian, Catalan, Croatian, Czech, Danish, Dutch, English, Estonian, Finnish, French, German, Greek, Hebrew, Hungarian, Indonesian, Italian, Japanese, Korean, Kurdish, Lithuanian, Norwegian, Persian, Polish, Portuguese, Romanian, Russian, Serbian, Simplified Chinese, Slovak, Slovene, Spanish, Swedish, Tamil, Thai, Tibetan, Traditional Chinese, Turkish, Ukrainian, Vietnamese
- Type: Raster graphics editor
- License: Proprietary
- Website: www.photopea.com

Photopea (/ˈfoʊtəˈpiː/ FOH-tə-PEE) is a web-based photo and graphics editor developed by Ivan Kutskir. It is used for image editing, making illustrations, web design or converting between different image formats. Photopea is free advertising-supported software, and offers a premium ad-free subscription for individuals and teams, and a corporate focused self-hostable version of the application. It is compatible with all modern web browsers, including Firefox, Opera, Edge, Chrome, and Safari. The app is compatible with raster and vector graphics, such as Photoshop's PSD as well as JPEG, PNG, DNG, GIF, SVG, PDF and other image file formats. While browser-based, Photopea stores all files locally, and does not upload any data to a server unless specified by the user. Options to save files and projects to cloud storage and to a device are available.

== Features ==
Photopea has various image editing tools including spot healing, a clone stamp for healing and replication, and a patch tool. The magic wand is one among the available set of selection tools that allow for greater precision in selecting specific color ranges or subjects in a project. Selections can further be refined to the pixel with the “Refine Edge” feature.

The software supports layers, layer masks, channels, selections, paths, smart objects, layer styles, text layers, filters and vector shapes.

Photopea offers cloud storage for project files to users who sign into Photopea known as PeaDrive. Free users are given 500 MB, and premium subscribers are given 5 GB. In addition to PeaDrive, users can save to cloud storage providers such as Dropbox or Google Drive directly.

Photopea offers AI features such as background removal, image replacement, and image generation. Photopea offers various AI generation models such as Stable Diffusion. Free users are able to use the AI generative features once per day and select AI features including subject select and background removal after watching an advertisement, while premium subscribers get 3,000 AI credits per month. Users can also pay for additional credits via the paid Dezgo API.

Photopea offers an ad-free premium subscription service for both individual users and for teams of up to 50 users. Users and organizations in need of more premium access accounts can self host Photopea for a fee. The subscription removes all ads from the application, makes the editor take up the full width of the user's screen, increases the amount of storage in PeaDrive from 500 MB to 5 GB, doubles the length of edit history, and gives users additional AI credits. Photopea can be self-hosted but requires a monthly fee. The price to self-host Photopea ranges from $500 to $2000 per month, varying depending on usage of the program. Kutskir earned around $1 million in 2020 with most coming from the advertisements on the website and the rest from premium users and self-hosting-fees.

== Reception ==
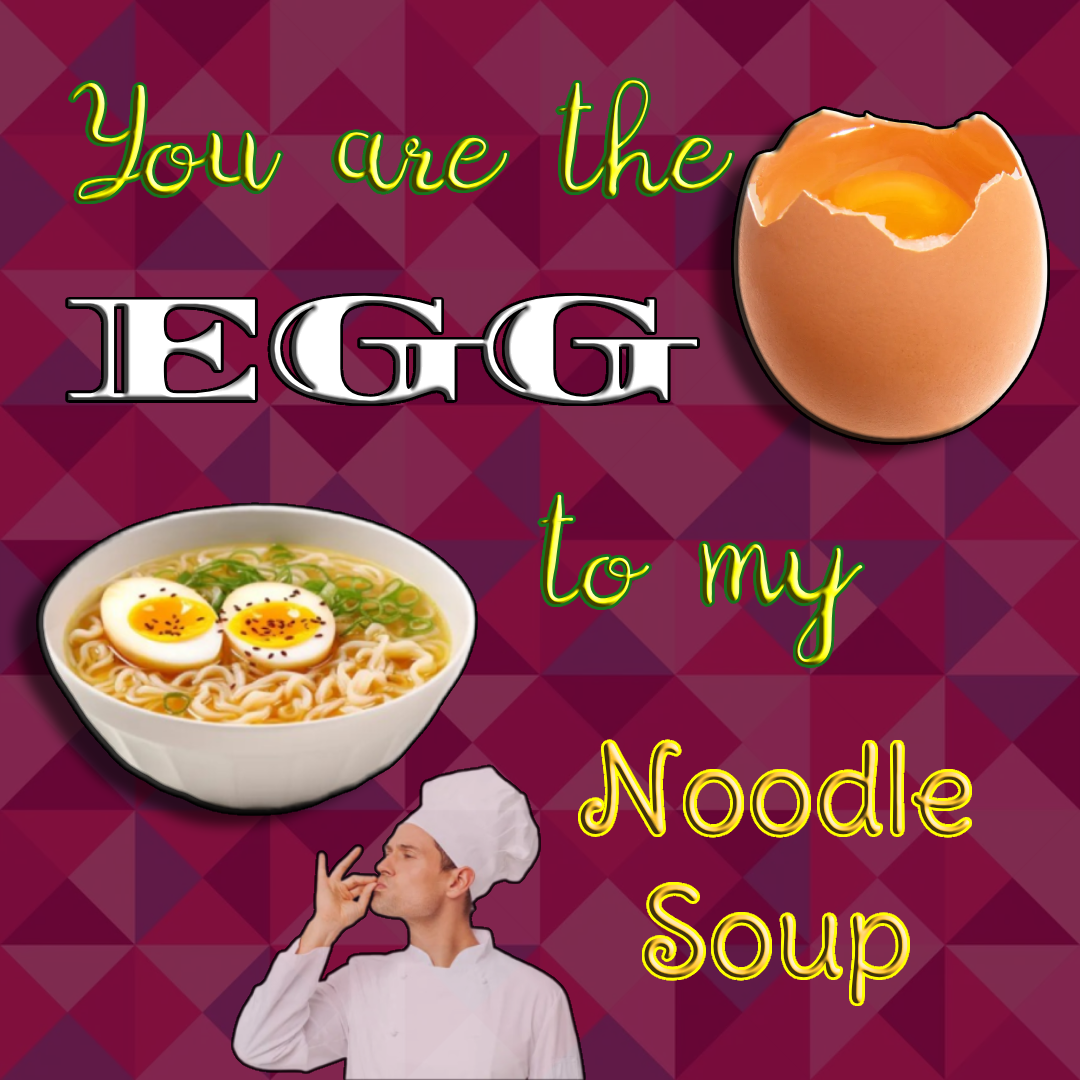
An example of a graphic created using Photopea

Photopea has received positive coverage due to its similarities to Adobe Photoshop in design and workflow, making it an easier program for those trained in Photoshop to use, compared to other free raster image editors such as GIMP.

== See also ==
- Comparison of raster graphics editors
- Pixelmator
- Adobe Photoshop
- SumoPaint
- Procreate
- GIMP
