= Corel Painter Essentials =

Raster graphics editor

Painter Essentials
- Developer(s): Corel
- Stable release: 8 / October 8, 2020; 4 years ago
- Operating system: Microsoft Windows, Mac OS X
- Type: Raster graphics editor
- License: Proprietary
- Website: Corel Painter Essentials Website

Corel Painter Essentials is a home software studio for turning photographs into paintings. Corel Painter Essentials is now in its 7th incarnation.

== Features ==
=== Workspaces ===
Painter Essentials provides two workspaces that can be switched between at any time.

The Drawing and Painting workspace is used for doodling, sketching or painting from scratch.

The Photo Painting workspace is used for creating a painting from a photograph. In this workspace, a variety of styles of paintings can be created from a photo in a single click. Alternatively, one can paint by hand with the program automatically choosing colors from the corresponding location in the original photo.

=== Tools ===
Painter Essentials provides a variety of brushes and media including oil, acrylic, watercolor, gouache, and ink wash paints, together with pencils, pens, charcoal, pastels, chalks and a variety of blenders. A variety of paper textures or canvases can be chosen for use in conjunction with any of these media.

Color can be selected from a set of traditional paint colors, adjusted by hue/saturation/value, or mixed in the mixer palette that mimics a traditional painter's palette.

The page can be freely rotated while drawing or painting, as one would do when using a traditional piece of paper.

The program also provides standard image editing features including layers and filters.

=== Learning Material ===
The program includes a set of tutorial videos by John Derry. These teach the viewer various techniques from automatically creating a painting from a photo, to introducing some touch-up by hand, to creating a cartoon, drawing or painting from scratch. Sample files are provided to allow one to follow along while watching the videos. The accompanying manual provides the same tutorials in written form, plus reference material and an art tips section.

== Versions ==
- Corel Painter Essentials (2003)
- Corel Painter Essentials 2 (2004)
- Corel Painter Essentials 3 (2005)
- Corel Painter Essentials 4 (2007)
- Corel Painter Essentials 5 (2015)
- Corel Painter Essentials 6 (2018)
- Corel Painter Essentials 7 (2019)
- Corel Painter Essentials 8 (2020)

== Relation to Corel Painter ==
Corel Painter Essentials is a hobbyist version of Corel's Painter line of software. Painter Essentials is used by art and photography hobbyists, while Corel Painter X is used by commercial designers, entertainment artists, professional photographers and fine artists.

Painter Essentials provides many of the same core features and capabilities as Painter X. However, in addition to the features of Painter Essentials, Painter X allows more customization of the user interface and brushes, and provides over 800 brush tools as compared to approximately 90 brushes in Painter Essentials.

== See also ==
- List of raster graphics editors
