= GIMPshop =

Modification for the graphics program GIMP

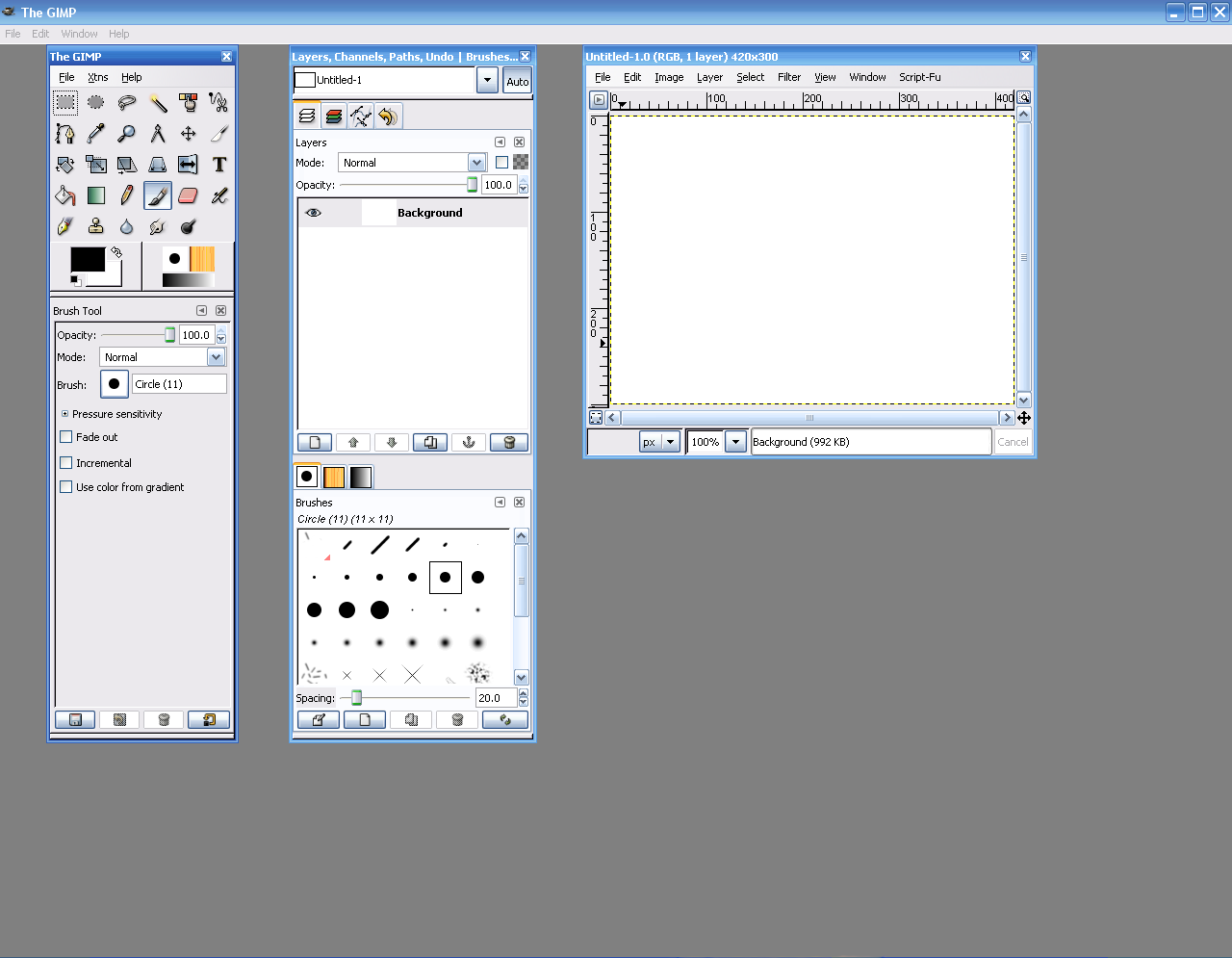
- A screenshot of GIMPshop on Windows XP
- Developer: Scott Moschella
- Operating system: Mac OS X, Linux, Microsoft Windows, Solaris
- Type: Raster graphics editor
- License: GPL-2.0-or-later
- Website: sourceforge.net/projects/gimpshop.mirror/

GIMPshop was a modification of the free and open source graphics program GNU Image Manipulation Program (GIMP), with the intent to imitate the look and feel of Adobe Photoshop.

== History ==
GIMPshop was created by Scott Moschella of Next New Networks (formerly Attack of the Show!) as an unofficial fork of GIMP. According to Moschella:

My original purpose for GIMPshop was to make the GIMP accessible to the many Adobe Photoshop users out there. I hope I’ve done that. And maybe along the way, I can convert a Photoshop pirate into a GIMP user.

He encountered resistance from GIMP's lead developers due to the methods he employed to implement his hacks. GIMPshop was originally developed for Mac OS X as a Universal Binary. It was ported to Microsoft Windows, Linux, and Solaris.

Development of GIMPshop effectively ceased by 2007, with the final version being based on GIMP version 2.2.11. Some users extended the lifespan of GIMPshop by manually updating GIMPshop's libraries themselves.

== Features ==
GIMPshop shared GIMP's feature list, customisability, and availability on multiple platforms, but had a different graphical user interface modeled on that of Photoshop. As a result, many tutorials for past versions of Photoshop could be followed in GIMPshop with little or no modification. All of GIMP's own plugins (filters, brushes, etc.) were available in GIMPshop.

Being based on GIMP, GIMPshop could not generate CMYK output files by default. Users who needed to generate color separations required additional software, since commercial printing requires CMYK, not RGB color channels. A workaround was made available through the Separate+ plugin.

In the Windows version, GIMPshop used a plugin called Deweirdifyer to combine the application's numerous windows in a similar manner to the MDI system used by most Windows graphics packages. This added a unifying background window that fully contained the entire GIMPshop UI. A third-party add-on for GIMP provided support for Photoshop plugins, called pspi, on Microsoft Windows or Linux.

For Mac OS X, GIMPshop was compatible only with Panther (10.3.x) and Tiger (10.4.x). It requires the X11.app (based on the X Window System display protocol) to render the user interface. Newer versions of X11 are no longer compatible with GIMPshop.

== Status ==
Due to pending concerns over rights to the GIMPshop name, and a dispute with the individual who purchased the gimpshop.com domain, plans for an update were abandoned. As explained by Moschella in 2010:

Not more than a few days after the OS X version was released and spread virally, someone who isn't me bought "Gimpshop.com", put up a site with hot-links to the files on my site and began advertising - LOTS of advertising. Soon, there were donate buttons, my name in the site's title and much more - making it look like my website.

I asked that the owner stop hot-linking my files (and draining my bandwidth), so he hosted them somewhere else. I questioned his motives and he said he was just a fan and that the site was a "fan-site".

It has been five years, the software has stagnated (due in no small part to my becoming discouraged by this one profiteer who trumped me, stole much of my traffic and bumped my site down to the second result when you search for "Gimpshop"). I assumed the guy would just give it up as I sadly let the project stagnate, but that hasn't happened.

In a March 2014 discussion, Moschella states:

I originally created Gimpshop, but I'm not the jerk who owns that domain and added adware & spyware to the source. Sorry about that. I hate that this guy is out there making my fun little project into an abomination.

….

I don't have a project site for it. I became discouraged after this whole ordeal and I let it slip away into obscurity. …. Gimpshop was a fun little 'prank' that got bigger than I ever expected. Sad what it has become, though.

== See also ==
- GIMP
- Adobe Photoshop
- Comparison of raster graphics editors
- Seashore
- GimPhoto
