= OpenCanvas =

Raster graphics editor

openCanvas
- Developer: PGN Corp.
- Release: 2000; 26 years ago
- Stable release: 7.0.25 / October 15, 2019; 7 years ago
- Operating system: Microsoft Windows
- Available in: English, Japanese, Simplified Chinese, Traditional Chinese
- Type: Raster graphics editor
- License: Shareware
- Website: portalgraphics.net

openCanvas is a raster graphics software developed and published by PGN Corp. It was originally released as freeware in 2000, but moved to a shareware model starting with version 2. All functions are available during the limited demo period. A higher performance version "openCanvas Plus" has been released simultaneously since version 3. Its functions are similar to Adobe Photoshop or Corel Painter.

In 2009, portalgraphics.net ended the sales of the openCanvas English versions. At the same time, they ended the English version of the portalgraphics website and their online English Customer Services, including PGN User Community. English Customer Support was to be discontinued on July 31, 2010. However, the English portalgraphics website went active again shortly afterward, and portalgraphics has continued sales of openCanvas series to the present.

"openCanvas 5.5.18" was released on July 26, 2013 in Japanese and English. On June 26, 2014, "openCanvas 6.0.00" was released with 64-bit support. On March 30, 2025 sales of openCanvas were moved to Steam.

== System requirements ==
=== openCanvas 4.5/ 4.5 Plus ===
openCanvas 4.5/ 4.5 Plus was released on April 5, 2007.

Windows

- OS: Windows Me / 2000 / XP (Neither Windows 98 nor 95 are supported. openCanvas 4.5/ 4.5 Plus does not support Windows Vista formally.)
- HDD: More than 10MB free capacity
- CPU: More than Intel Pentium 500 MHz
- RAM: 128 MB
- Resolution: More than 1024 × 768 pixels
- Color depth: More than 32-bit (16,770,000 colors)
- Peripherals: Wacom tablet, XP-pen

=== openCanvas 5.05 ===
openCanvas 5.05 was released on April 4, 2011.

Windows

- OS: Windows XP / Vista / 7
- HDD: More than 10MB free capacity
- CPU: x86-compatible processor corresponding to SSE2
- RAM: Recommended memory capacity by operating system
- Resolution: More than 1024 × 768 pixels
- Color depth: More than 32-bit (16,770,000 colors)
- Peripherals: Wacom tablet

=== openCanvas 5.5 ===
openCanvas 5.5 was released on July 2, 2012.

Windows

- OS: Windows XP / Vista / 7
- HDD: More than 10MB free capacity
- CPU: x86-compatible processor corresponding to SSE2
- RAM: Recommended memory capacity by operating system
- Resolution: More than 1024 × 768 pixels
- Color depth: More than 32-bit (16,770,000 colors)
- Peripherals: Wacom tablet

=== openCanvas 6.0 ===
openCanvas 6.0 was released on June 26, 2014.

Windows

- OS: Windows Vista / 7 / 8 / 8.1 / 10
- HDD: More than 10MB free capacity
- CPU: x86-compatible processor corresponding to SSE2
- RAM: Recommended 4Gb or more (32-bit) / 8Gb or more (64-bit)
- Resolution: More than 1024 × 768 pixels
- Color depth: More than 32-bit (16,770,000 colors)
- Peripherals: Wacom tablet / Tablet PCs compatible to TabletPC API

=== openCanvas 7.0 ===
openCanvas 7.0 was released on September 21, 2017

Windows

- OS: Windows 7 or newer
- HDD: More than 10MB free capacity
- CPU: x86-compatible processor corresponding to SSE2
- RAM: 500 MB RAM
- Resolution: 1280 x 768 / True Color
- Color depth: More than 32-bit (16,770,000 colors)
- Peripherals: Wacom tablet / Tablet PCs compatible to TabletPC API

== See also ==
- List of raster graphics editors
- Comparison of raster graphics editors
