= Brush Strokes Image Editor =

Bitmap graphics editor

- Screenshot of two tool boxes in the Brush Strokes Image Editor.
- Original author: Paul Bird
- Stable release: 1.01
- Operating system: Microsoft Windows
- Type: bitmap graphics editor
- License: freeware
- Website: www.pabird.supanet.com/~pabird/freesoftware/brushstrokes/

Brush Strokes Image Editor 1.01 is a bitmap graphics editor made by Paul Bird for Microsoft Windows. It is released as freeware.

== Features ==
- GIF animations
- filters (e.g. blur, sharpen, negative, outline, posterize)
- transformations (e.g. rotation, perspective, twist)
- colour adjustment
- selections (e.g. magic wand, colour selections)
- paint tools (e.g. pen, brush, clone tool)
- pattern and image fills
- transparency
- feathering
- crop

The "Filters & Lenses" tool box has a noise reduction function that retains edges within the canvas. It can significantly reduce or eliminate speckles and smudging in JPEG images. Any of the filters can be applied repeatedly for two seconds by clicking on the last button in the tool box. The first row of buttons in the tool box apply the current pen color as a semi-transparent gradient superimposed on the canvas:

- Top to bottom
- Right to left
- Bottom to top
- Left to right

The "Distortions" tool box performs horizontal & vertical flips and rotations. It also contains the "stretch or twist" and "perspective" tools, although they do not perform automatic antialiasing, in the free version of the software.

Note: Right-click the mouse in Brush Strokes to show tooltips. They don't appear automatically.

=== Conway's Game of Life simulation ===
An unusual addition to the "Filters & Lenses" tool box is an implementation of Conway's Game of Life. It is a cellular automaton in which cells replicate or die according to a simple set of rules. The initial pattern of cells constitutes the first generation of automata in the simulation. In Brush Strokes, the pattern of pixels in an image constitute the initial state. Each of the three buttons at the bottom of the "Filters & Lenses" tool box either launches an iteration of the game, modifies the image by a plug-in filter, or triggers the last command repeatedly for two seconds. Any of the filters in the tool box can be applied before proceeding with the game.

== Bitmap formats ==
- BMP
- JPEG
- GIF
- PCX
- TIFF
- TGA
- PNG (import only)
- AVI (import only)

== See also ==
- List of raster graphics editors
- Comparison of raster graphics editors
