= GNU Paint =

Raster graphics editor

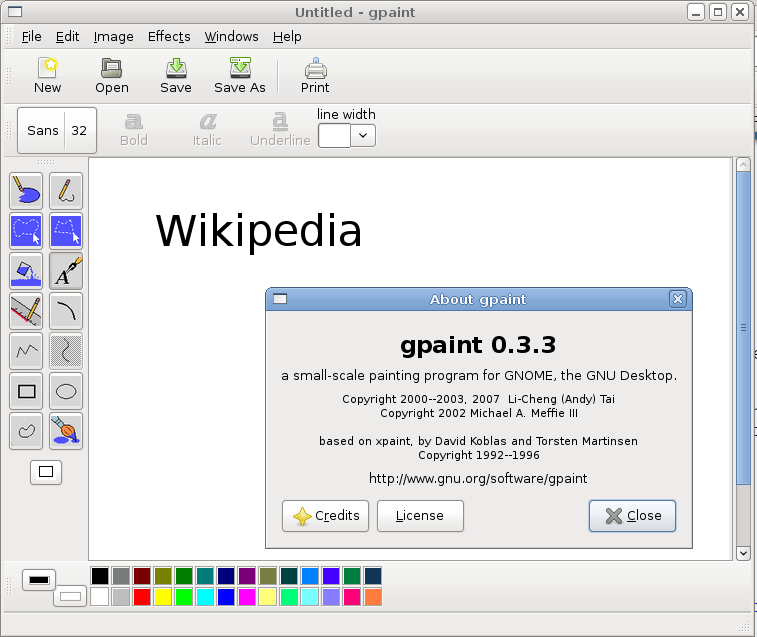
- GNU Paint v0.3.3-6
- Developer(s): Andy Tai
- Stable release: 0.3.3 / 10 September 2007
- Repository: git.savannah.gnu.org/cgit/gpaint.git
- Written in: C
- Operating system: GNU
- Available in: English
- Type: Raster graphics editor
- License: GPL-3.0-or-later
- Website: gnu.org/software/gpaint/

GNU Paint, otherwise known as Gpaint, is a raster graphics editor similar to Microsoft Paint. It is free software under the terms of the GPL-3.0-or-later license and is part of the GNU Project.

== Overview ==
Features of gpaint include:

- Drawing tools such as ovals, freehand, polygon and text, with fill or shadow for polygons and closed freehand shapes.
- Cut and paste by selecting irregular regions or polygons.
- Preliminary print support using gnome-print.
- Modern, easy-to-use user interface with tool and color palettes.
- Multiple-image editing in a single instance of the program.
- All the image processing features present in XPaint.
- No facility to crop images
- No ability to make rectangular selections
- NB No undo feature

== See also ==
- KolourPaint
- MyPaint
