= UFR =

UFR may refer to:

- Under-frequency relay, a type of protective relay used to trip an electrical line when its operating frequency drops below a certain threshold
- Union of Resistance Forces, rebel group in Chad
- Ultra Fast Rendering, a printer language
- Université de Franche-Comté, a University in eastern France

== See also ==
- UFRaw, an application which can read and manipulate photographs in raw image formats
