= Fotografix =

Raster graphics editor

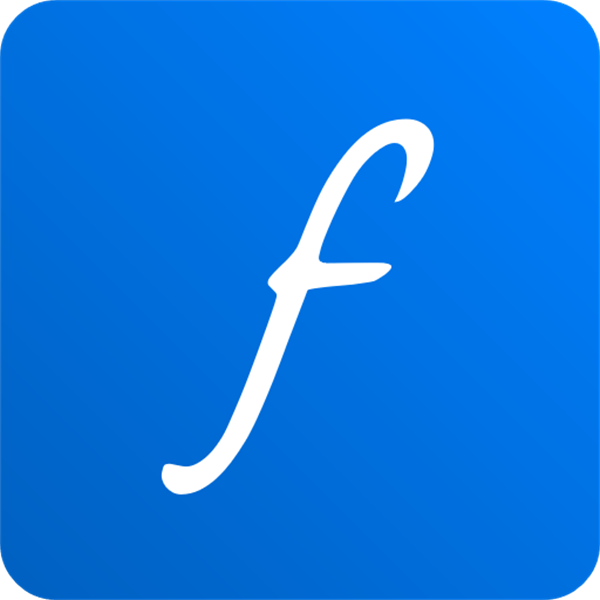
- Developer: Madhavan Lakshminarayanan
- Release: April 14, 2009; 17 years ago
- Stable release: 2023.4.1 / 9 April 2023; 3 years ago
- Written in: C#
- Operating system: Microsoft Windows
- Type: Photo editor
- License: MIT License
- Website: lmadhavan.com/fotografix/
- Repository: github.com/lmadhavan/fotografix

Fotografix is a free and open-source photo editing application for Microsoft Windows. It has been noted for being light on system resources while still providing features found in larger software.

== History ==
Fotografix was initially released as a raster graphics editor in 2009, followed by a series of updates through 2010 leading up to version 1.5.

Fotografix 2 was announced in 2012 and a preview version was made available later that year.

In November 2021, a new version was announced that shifted its focus to photo editing and dropped general-purpose image editing features from previous versions.

== Features ==
Fotografix is a non-destructive photo editor that does not modify the original photo directly but instead keeps track of adjustments separately. It features basic adjustments such as exposure, contrast, highlights and shadows as well as HSL for selective color adjustments.

== See also ==
- Comparison of raster graphics editors
- Image editing
- KPhotoAlbum
