= Project Dogwaffle =

Raster graphics editor

- Developer: Dan Ritchie
- Release: 1997; 29 years ago
- Operating system: Microsoft Windows
- Available in: English
- Type: Raster graphics editor
- License: Proprietary
- Website: thebest3d.com/dogwaffle

Project Dogwaffle is a raster graphics editor with animation capabilities. It was written by Dan Ritchie, runs on Microsoft Windows, and has both freeware and commercial versions. The commercial version, PD Pro Digital Painter, is updated frequently while the most recent freeware version is Project Dogwaffle 1.2, released in 2004. The free version is fully functional, lacking only the advanced layer and scripting tools in version 2 of the commercial product.

Project Dogwaffle features include realistic paint effects similar to Corel Painter, a frame-based animation tool, the standard paint tools common to most modern bitmap paint programs, and an alpha channel for transparency effects.

PD Pro 4 was updated to make use of multithreading with multiple processors. Features include realtime filters that update as you adjust them in full screen, and a particle painting tool that paints things like trees and grass, and can also be animated to produce typical particle system effects.

Animation tools include a timeline for applying filters, an exposure sheet, a keyframer to move images around, the ability to paint with animated brushes, a batch processor, pulldowns and retiming, and other items of use to animators and motion graphic artists.

Some conventions and keyboard shortcuts found in Deluxe Paint, which was ubiquitous on the Amiga, are recognized.

The name "Project Dogwaffle" refers to the first waffle that comes out of a waffle iron, the one for the dog. The name harkens back to the very beginning of development that started on a weekend after the developer tried to draw a box in Photoshop.

Project Dogwaffle uses Lua programming language to let the end-user create new imaging filters. DogLua is based on a 'gluas' plugin spec developed initially for the GIMP. Lua scripting is also available in other digital painting programs, such as ArtWeaver and Twistedbrush. Some implementations have their respective extensions. When the core GIMP-original gluas syntax is used without proprietary extensions, these imaging filters can be shared and used across these applications for the benefit of other users. Some extensions from Project Dogwaffle have found their way also into others such as ArtWeaver.

In 2011, Dogwaffle was split into PD Howler and PD Artist lines of products, with the Artist label for those not requiring animation tools.

Around v9, some 3D features started using the GPU.

In v9.5/9.6, the 3D Designer had a fairly major addition of features for more realistic looking landscapes, with erosion, sediments, and texturing based on elevation and slope. Version 9.6 became the first release available on Steam for game developers.

As of early 2016, version 10 was the latest so far, and development continued for new features, and another release on Steam. Several additional features were released through the year as add-on plugins such as a Worley Noise filter.

== See also ==
- Comparison of raster graphics editors
