= CodedColor PhotoStudio Pro =

Bitmap graphics editor

- Developer: 1STEIN
- Stable release: 8.2.0 / February 1, 2020; 6 years ago
- Operating system: Windows
- Type: image organizer
- License: Proprietary, Shareware
- Website: www.codedcolor.com/en/

CodedColor is a bitmap graphics editor and image organizer for computers running the Microsoft Windows operating system and is published by 1STEIN.

CodedColor contains different tools for image editing and viewing. Additionally, it has other features such as a web album export, annotations, database and keyword searching, contact sheets, screen shows, batch conversion, photo finishing, red eye correction, screen capture and TWAIN import.

== Details ==
CodedColor PhotoStudio is a photo organizer and image editing software for digital camera users. The software comes with a handbook and a database to store Exif / IPTC data and color information.

The interface includes features like photo editing & printing, web album galleries, slide shows, photo management & cataloging, custom sorting, IPTC & Exif editor, thumbnail generation, resize & resample images, jp2000, batch conversion, database keyword searching, red eye removal, color / sharpness / brightness & contrast correction, artefacts removal, clone brush, scanner & TWAIN import, screen capture, lossless JPEG rotation, gamma correction, print ordering and screen shows with many transition effects, watermark text, image annotations, panorama stitch & animation, video capture, PDF album export, photo layouts, collages, frames, shadows, histograms, automatic white balance, and Skype photo sharing.

The user can also rename multiple images, remove scratches, create panorama pictures (stitch), convert RAW photos (from Canon, Nikon, Olympus, etc. cameras), send images via Skype, send photo SMS, burn digital watermarks, correct colors, run a screen show, convert and correct JPEG images in a batch process, rename fields, open pictures and image folders from the Explorer, generate a web album in HTML and compress and resize images.

It opens and converts all common image formats: BMP, WMF, GIF, JPEG, JPEG2000, TIFF, PCX, PNG, PSP, PSD, PCD, and all current RAW formats. The software package includes Pixpedia Publisher, a photo layout and desktop publishing tool.

== Media ==
CodedColor PhotoStudio has received awards and magazine articles, for example from CNET.

== See also ==
- List of raster graphics editors
- Comparison of raster graphics editors
