= GimPhoto =

- Developer: Ek Kian

Stable release(s)
- Linux: 1.4.3 / August 2008
- macOS: 26.1 / August 2011
- Windows: 24.10 / December 2014
- Operating system: Linux, Microsoft Windows, Mac OS X
- Type: Raster graphics editor
- License: GPL-2.0-or-later
- Website: www.gimphoto.com

GimPhoto is a modification of the free and open source graphics program GNU Image Manipulation Program (GIMP), with the intent to be a free replacement to Adobe Photoshop. It has a new menu layout, new brushes and gradient sets. Its primary purpose is to enhance GIMP in terms of user interface, use of the best plugins and other resources combined with the latest stable version of GIMP. Because the menu layouts are much closer to Photoshop's, adaptation from Photoshop is much quicker than GIMP.

Version 24.1 for Windows is with new installer for Windows 8.1 including 7 and new 10.

Version 26.1 for Mac OS X 10.6+ is also available. It is based on GIMP 2.6.8 and needs X11.

== Future development ==
In 2008, the developer planned to base the next GimPhoto release on GIMP 2.4.5, while leaving open whether a subsequent release would support GIMP 2.6 or move directly to GIMP 2.8.

== See also ==
- GIMP
- Adobe Photoshop
- Comparison of raster graphics editors
- Seashore
- GIMPshop
