= WinImages =

Graphics editor for Microsoft Windows

Black Belt Systems WinImages is a bitmap graphics editor and special effects applicator that supports both automation of editing tasks and animation of effects. WinImages is a MDI application which runs under Windows 95 and later versions of Microsoft Windows.

WinImages began life in 1985 as a product called ImageMaster. It was ported to Windows in 1989, which is when the name was changed to WinImages.

As of December 2004, WinImages is at version 7.5.

== Summary of WinImages features ==
- Timeline for animation on still image, and animation on animation
- 177 image manipulation operation classes in 15 functional groups
- 790 built-in static or timeline-aware controls
- Unlimited number of scripted timeline-aware controls
- Integral ray tracer with timeline-aware engine
- Integral heightfield renderer with timeline-aware engine
- Integral particle system renderer with timeline-aware engine
- Integral texture generator with timeline-aware engine
- 74 layer modes, the usual 20 or so, plus unusual modes like geometric warping
- 14 area selection tools
- Embedded custom scripting language similar to BASIC
- RGB, HSV, CMY and CMYK color separation
- Open plug-in specification (presumes C is development language) with services
- Reads 340 variations of 22 different bitmap image file types
- Writes 25 variations of 13 different bitmap image file types
- Additional animation types are extended by Windows 32-bit CODECS

== Reception ==
Compute! in December 1993 said that WinImages: morph "is a program for the true morph enthusiast [and] even easy to use". PC Review in July 1996 gave version 4 of the software a 9/10 rating, praising its ease of use and wide range of capabilities.

== See also ==
- List of raster graphics editors
- Comparison of raster graphics editors
