= Photogenics =

Graphics editing software package

Photogenics is a proprietary raster graphic editing software produced by Idruna Software.

== Features ==
Photogenics can work with different color models like CMYK and HDR. Supported HDR formats include OpenEXR, TIFF, Alias, Cineon/PDX, and others. The program is capable of handling various RAW file formats such as those used by Canon or Nikon cameras.

== Platforms ==
Photogenics was originally developed for AmigaOS and published by Almathera Systems Ltd. It was later ported to Microsoft Windows, Linux and Microsoft Pocket PC platform. Current version no longer supports Linux.

== See also ==
- Comparison of raster graphics editors
- List of raster graphics editors
- Raster graphics editor
- Raster graphics aka Bitmap
- Vector editors versus bitmap editors
