= Portrait Professional =

Graphics software

PortraitPro
- Developer: Anthropics Technology Ltd
- Release: July 2006; 20 years ago
- Stable release: 23.00 / October 8, 2022; 3 years ago
- Operating system: Mac OS X and Microsoft Windows
- Type: Raster graphics editor
- License: Proprietary
- Website: www.anthropics.com/portraitpro

Portrait Professional or PortraitPro is a portrait photography retouching software developed by Anthropics Technology and initially released in 2006. It automates the photo editing process with algorithms that manipulate facial features, remove skin imperfections, alter colors and tone, replace the background, and so on. It is available as a standalone application, as well as Adobe Photoshop, Lightroom, Photoshop Elements, and Aperture plug-ins on Windows and OS X systems.

== History ==
PortraitPro was released in 2006 by Anthropics Technology, a company founded in 1997 as the research branch of the UK National Film and Television School. The algorithms that allowed the software to identify facial features, assess the "attractiveness", and adjust the photo were developed in conjunction with researchers from Cambridge University, Oxford University, and Manchester University. The program initially required an active internet connection to calculate point data for face shaping, but moved to a standalone edition with version 6.

PortraitPro 9 (2009) introduced the novel ClearSkin automated skin enhancer, which corrects skin defects, such as acne, blotchiness, roughness, wrinkles, age spots, and so on. Version 10 (2012) added a specialized Child mode that applies enhancements suitable for the portraits of children. In PortraitPro 12 (2014) the developers presented lighting and relighting effects based on a 3D model of the face built based on a 2D photo, and full optimization 64-bit systems, which provided a notable performance leap.

In 2016, Anthropics Technology released PortraitPro Body, which employed the technology for body shape manipulation. It automatically identifies and mark-ups the body curves and position of the bones and allows the user to make adjustments to build, shape, and posture and use standard retouching tools to smooth the skin and remove blemishes. It was provided in standard standalone edition and studio edition, which adds plug-ins for Photoshop, Elements, and Lightroom.

PortraitPro 17 introduced a background removal and replacement feature, while version 18 added a brush that locally removes adjustments and edits for more complex and accurate work In the following years, the developers added sky replacement tool and a library of sky styles, and made numerous enhancements for the existing automated and manual retouching tools.

== Features ==
PortraitPro is available in Standard, Studio, and Studio Max editions. A basic standalone edition supports JPG and 24-bit TIFF files. Studio adds support for RAW and 48-bit coloc, conversion between color spaces and JPEG/TIFF embedded color profile support. It also enables batch editing. Studio Max is marketed as a professional tool with enhanced batch mode. Studio and Studio Max editions also work as plug-ins for Adobe Photoshop, Lightroom, Photoshop Elements, and Aperture.

PortraitPro supports English, German, French, Spanish, Italian, Brazilian Portuguese, and Swedish. Older versions had support for Korean and Japanese languages.

=== Tools ===
Portrait Professional includes controls for face sculpting, skin smoothing and lighting, eyes, mouth and nose, hair, skin coloring, and overall picture adjustments.

- Presets are pre-loaded settings for specific photo retouching tasks.
- Touch Up/Restore Brush allow to remove spots and blemishes manually / restore the changes applied by automated retouching.
- Batch Mode allows for batch editing (supported in Studio and Studio Max editions)
- Face Sculpt Controls adjust the shape of the face
- Skin Smoothing Controls automate the skin retouching process (and allows to manually select the areas it should be applied to)
- Eye Controls remove the "red eyes" on the photo and improves the general appearance of the eyes.
- Mouth and Nose Controls improve the appearance of the mouth and nose.
- Skin Coloring Controls adjust the color tone of the skin.
- Skin Lighting Controls enhance the lighting on the skin.
- Makeup Controls digitally add make-up, such as eyeliner, eyeshadow, lipstick, blusher, and mascara.
- Hair Controls improve the appearance of the hair (and allows to manually select the areas it should be applied to)
- Picture Controls allow to adjust brightness, contrast, and other basic settings, and provides a cropping tool.
- Layers feature allow to remove or replace the background and add overlays.

== See also ==
- Raster Graphics Editors
