= Retouch4me =

AI photo editing software

- Original author: Oleg Sharonov
- Release: 2020; 6 years ago
- Operating system: Microsoft Windows, OS X
- Type: photo retouching software
- Website: retouch4.me

Retouch4me is a family of artificial intelligence-powered plug-ins for photography and video retouching, compatible with Adobe Photoshop; Adobe Lightroom, and Capture One (as external editors).

== Development ==
Retouch4me plug-ins were developed by Oleg Sharonov, the author of 3D LUT Creator (a tool for professional color grading). The plug-ins resulted from eight years of photo retouching experience and two years of studying deep learning. The underlying neural networks were trained using professionally retouched photos, including the ones submitted by the community.

== Plug-ins ==
Plug-ins address specific time-consuming common retouching tasks: healing skin blemishes, background cleanup, cleaning up wrinkles and tears in fabric, enhancing eyes, whitening teeth, smoothing out skin tone, adding depth and dimension to portraits, and general dodging and burning. The neural networks identify body and face, clothes and backgrounds, find issues, and correct them.

The software is available as a stand-alone app for Microsoft Windows and OS X, and can be launched through Adobe Photoshop, Adobe Lightroom, and Capture One. A DaVinci Resolve Heal OFX video plug-in, announced in July 2022, applies healing in video. Plug-ins are sold separately with lifetime licenses.

Plug-ins are applied individually and can be automated with custom actions in Photoshop. The user can adjust the applied effect, specify the area it should be applied to, and preview the result. The calculations are performed on the workstation and don't require an active internet connection. The operations themselves take a few seconds.

- Dodge&Burn uses dodging and burning techniques to smooth skin texture and fix trouble areas like nasolabial folds, periorbital dark circles, skin bumps, veins, unflattering shadows, and highlights, and such.
- Portrait Volumes adds depth and dimension to portraits by dodging and burning certrain areas of the image to emphasize the eyes, nose, and lips and slightly adjusting contrast, exposure, and colors.
- Eye Vessels (bundled with Eye Brilliance) removes unsightly blood vessels to make the eyes appear more white.
- Eye Brilliance (bundled with Eye Vessels) automatically detects eyes and retouches them using the dodging and burning technique.
- Heal fixes minor skin imperfections, such as acne and post-acne marks, pimples, enlarged pores, and so on. It doesn't rely on smoothing and therefore preserves skin texture.
- Clean Backdrop detects and removes dirt, folds, holes, sensor dust, and other details from evenly-colored studio backgrounds.
- Skin Tone evens out the general hue of the skin and removes redness.
- White Teeth identifies teeth and adds a natural-looking whitening.
- Fabric smooths out creases and wrinkles on fabric and evens the color tones without removing unsightly folds or rolls of clothing.
- Skin Mask enables one-click skin selection, which comes in handy for overall skin adjustments.

In July 2022, Retouch4me announced the Heal OFX Video Plugin, a video retouching plug-in for DaVinci Resolve. Oleg Sharonov explained that the plug-in was developed to simplify the workflow for the users who employed the photographic Heal plug-in to retouch videos frame-by-frame.

== Awards ==
In April 2024, RetouchMe obtained the Technical Image Press Association award for the best AI portrait editing software.

== Reviews ==
Retouch4me received positive reviews in professional media for nondestructive approach and preservation of skin tone, texture, and level of details. Patrick Hill from Fstoppers considered that the plug-ins raised the bar of AI automation in high-end photography. Sean McCormac, the Photoshop User reviewer, pointed out that they take care of the most tedious parts of retouching work.

DOCMA (Germany's popular print magazine on image editing with Photoshop and Lightroom) and TechRadar included Retouch4me in their forecasts on the future of photography as a notable example of AI-powered technology. A photography news aggregator PetaPixel named it the best plugin for AI photo retouching in its 2022 rating.
