= Photo Mechanic =

Photo tool developed by Camera Bits

- Developer(s): Camera Bits, Inc
- Stable release: 6.0 / March 25, 2019; 6 years ago
- Operating system: Mac OS X, Windows
- Type: image browser
- Website: www.camerabits.com

Photo Mechanic is a front-end photo ingesting, tagging, and browsing tool by Portland, Oregon-based company Camera Bits.

Photo Mechanic supports the initial capture of photos from the camera, previewing and making selections, and tagging each photo with various types of IPTC metadata such as captions, keywords, and copyright notices.

While Photo Mechanic has basic support for simple image edits, such as crops, it is meant to be used in concert with a dedicated photo editing program, such as Adobe Photoshop or Adobe Photoshop Lightroom. In contrast to competing products such as iView Media Pro, Adobe Bridge, or Extensis Portfolio, Photo Mechanic does not include photo cataloging or asset management features.

Photo Mechanic uses the Metadata (IPTC) Template to label its photos.
