= NeoPaint =

Raster graphics editor

- NeoPaint for Windows
- Developers: OSCS Software Development, Inc.(1991-1993); NeoSoft Corp (1993 - 2018); SinLios Soluciones Digitales S.L. (2018 - present)
- Release: November 5, 1992; 33 years ago
- Stable release: 5.3.0
- Operating system: MS-DOS, Microsoft Windows
- Size: 10MB
- Available in: English
- Type: Raster graphics editor
- License: Proprietary software
- Website: visualneo.com/product/pixelneo

NeoPaint is a raster graphics editor for Windows and MS-DOS. It supports several file formats including JPEG, GIF, BMP, PNG, and TIFF. The developer, NeoSoft, advertises NeoPaint as "being simple enough for use by children while remaining powerful enough for the purposes of advanced image editing".

The first version, NeoPaint 1.0, was released in 1992 on floppy disks. It supported video modes ranging from 640x350 to 1024x768 and multiple fonts.

NeoPaint 2.2 came out for MS-DOS 3.1 in 1993, with support of for 2, 16, or 256 color images in Hercules, EGA, VGA, and Super VGA modes.

NeoPaint 3.1 was released in 1995 supporting 24-bit images and formats like PCX, TIFF and BMP. NeoPaint 3.2 was released in 1996. An updated version, NeoPaint 3.2a, supported the GIF file format. NeoPaint 3.2d was released in 1998.

A Windows 95 version named NeoPaint for Windows v4.0 was released in 1999 supporting the PNG file format.

On September 1, 2018 the program was rebranded as PixelNEO, becoming one of the VisualNEO software products. Formats such as JPEG 2000, ICO, CUR, PSD and RAW are supported.

NeoPaint for Windows

NeoPaint for DOS
