= PhotoScape =

Graphics editing program

PhotoScape X

- PhotoScape version 3.6.5
- Developer: MOOII Tech
- Initial release: May 28, 2008; 17 years ago
- Stable release: 3.7 / September 11, 2014; 11 years ago
- Written in: C++
- Operating system: NT/2000/XP/Vista/7/8/macOS/Ubuntu
- Platform: Microsoft Windows, Mac, Linux
- Size: 356.09 MB
- Available in: Arabic, Bulgarian, Catalan, Chinese (Simplified), Chinese (Traditional), Czech, Danish, English, Estonian, Finnish, French, Galician, German, Greek, Hebrew, Indonesian, Italian, Hungarian, Japanese, Korean, Nederlands, Norwegian, Polish, Portuguese, Romanian, Russian, Serbian Cyrillic, Serbian Latin, Slovak, Spanish, Swedish, Thai, Ukrainian
- Type: Raster graphics editor
- License: Freeware
- Website: www.photoscape.org

PhotoScape is a graphics editing program, developed by MOOII Tech, Korea. The basic concept of PhotoScape is 'easy and fun', allowing users to easily edit photographs taken from their digital cameras or even mobile phones. PhotoScape provides a simple user interface to perform common photo enhancements including color adjustment, cutting, resizing, printing and GIF animation. Photoscape operates on Microsoft Windows and Mac and is available on Linux systems as a Snap package. The default languages are English and Korean, with additional language packages available for download.

Version 3.7 is the current stable release for Windows XP, 7, Vista, or 8. The current version Photoscape X is for Windows 10 and macOS 10.12 or later, with a pro version available for a fee. Older versions are still available for Windows 98 or ME users. It is distributed free of charge for all users, including commercial bodies.

== Features ==
PhotoScape can perform tasks of:

- Photo Editor: Enhance and balance color, resize, add effects, Overlays and clip-arts.
- Photo Batch-Editor: Process multiple photos at once, rename multiple photos at once.
- Collage Creator: joins multiple photos into poster-like single page or into one final photo.
- GIF Animation: Make multiple images into GIF-animated image.
- Featured Printer: Print photos for particular occasions, such as Passport photo, or lined page such as graph, calendar or music paper.
- Screen Capture: Save monitor screen into an image file.
- Color Picker: Pick color from screen pixel.
- RAW Converter: Convert RAW format picture into JPEG format.
- Face Finder: Find similar faces through internet.
- Screen Capture: Windows 10: full screen, window, or box selection.

== Notable release ==
Version	Release date	Significant changes
3.1	May 28, 2008	Initial release
3.2	October 9, 2008	Many new options and supports +19 languages
3.3	January 5, 2009	Many new options, adjustments, tools and supports +23 languages
3.4	August 28, 2009	Many new options, adjustments, supports netbook resolutions (1024×600) and supports +27 languages
3.5	May 24, 2010	Adjustments, new tools, stop supportings Windows 95, 98 and Me, start support Windows 7, Vista and supports +34 languages
3.6	December 21, 2011	New options, adjustments and supports +37 languages
3.6.1	February 28, 2012	Adjustments, new tools
3.6.2	April 23, 2012	Adjustments, support RAW files
3.6.3	December 27, 2012	Adjustments and new functions, vibration brush included
3.6.4	June 25, 2013	Adjustments, new tools and functions, JPEG quality option improved
3.6.5	July 5, 2013	Bug fixes for Sharpen, Blur and Bloom filters, Blur Brush upgraded
1.0	October 23, 2013	Forked into Photoscape X ("Windows XP, 7, Vista, or 8, please use PhotoScape 3.7.")
2.0	December 9, 2014	
2.1	January 8, 2015	
2.2	April 28, 2015	
2.3	October 28, 2015	
2.4	May 20, 2016	
2.4.1	July 16, 2016	
2.5	December 17, 2016	
2.6	July 6, 2017	
2.6.1	July 15, 2017	
2.6.2	July 16, 2017	
2.6.3	August 24, 2017	
2.7	December 21, 2017	
2.7.1	December 23, 2017	
3.0.0	April 23, 2019	
4.0/4.01/4.02	Dec 17, 2019 / Dec 21, 2019 / Dec 31, 2019	
4.1/4.1.1	Oct 22, 2020 / Nov 6, 2020	
4.2/4.2.1	Jan 16, 2022 / Jan 21, 2022	
