= Bloom Image Editor =

- Developer: Sad Cat Software
- Release: April 29, 2015; 11 years ago
- Operating system: OS X, Windows, Linux
- Type: Raster graphics editor, Vector graphics editor
- License: Proprietary
- Website: www.thebloomapp.com

Bloom Image Editor, formerly known as Ormr, is a non-destructive, node-based vector and raster image editor for Mac OS X, Windows, and Linux. Bloom features selection, painting, retouching, color correction tools, as well as layer-based image editing. Every operation is preserved individually and is editable at any point in time.

== Features ==
- Node-based compositing.
- Non-destructive workflow.
- Support for 16-bit high color images.
- Photoshop images with layers are supported as well as other popular still image file formats.
- Uses layers-based editing.
- Editable Liquify tool and Brush tool strokes.

== Name change ==
Originally named Ormr, the application was later renamed to Bloom for easier pronunciation.

== See also ==
- Comparison of raster graphics editors
