= Adobe PhotoDeluxe =

Image editing software line

PhotoDeluxe was a consumer-oriented image editing software line published by Adobe Systems from 1996 until July 8, 2002. At that time it was replaced by Adobe's newly launched consumer-oriented image editing software Photoshop Elements. Adobe no longer provides technical support for the PhotoDeluxe software line.

PhotoDeluxe had a range of image processing capabilities for the home photographer and image handler. These included removing red-eye, cropping, and adjusting brightness, contrast, and sharpness. It also included software to extract pictures from an image scanner. Among the functionality included was the ability to dynamically resize photos and export them in a wide range of formats. It also had a range of printing options including printing multiple copies of an image on the same page. It was often bundled free with Epson scanners or as free software with new computers.

== Features ==
Despite the critical concerns regarding the quality of the setup, Photo Deluxe supports layering, blurs, sharpening, cloning, gradient fills, color and background switches, color variations, resizing options, and many other features. Another drawback of PhotoDeluxe was that it was designed for Mac computers, so working on Windows PC was a problem for those who were unable to customize their preferences.

== Versions ==
=== Adobe PhotoDeluxe 1.0 ===
The first version was released in 1996 for Windows and Macintosh computers. In one year, it sold over one million copies.

=== Adobe PhotoDeluxe 2.0 ===
The new version was released in 1997 and had added features such as a Clone Tool, red-eye removal, and sample templates for making posters, cards, and calendars. It also had new special effect features.

=== Adobe PhotoDeluxe 3.0 ===
The 3rd version was released in 1998. The new features included customizable clipart settings, the ability to import photos on the web, enhanced repair activities following Guided Activities, and Adobe Connectables to add new activities.

=== Adobe PhotoDeluxe Home Edition (4.0) ===
Version 4.0 was created by the makers of Photoshop. It had advanced abilities such as tools to add animation, voice, and music to a picture. It also had features to restore photos to their original position.

== History ==
Adobe PhotoDeluxe 1.0 was released in 1996 for Macintosh computers, initially retailing for an MSRP of $49. The software did quite well, reportedly selling over a million copies by February of the next year, primarily due to bundles with companies like Apple and Hewlett-Packard. PhotoDeluxe was primarily advertised to consumers as a way to do basic photo manipulation, such as cropping and rotating images, or creating simple cards and calendars. PhotoDeluxe 2.0 was released in 1997, and was the last version of PhotoDeluxe that Adobe made that worked on Macs. PhotoDeluxe 2.0 became the "number one selling consumer photo-editing software product in the world." PhotoDeluxe 3.0 was released in 1998, where it was rebranded as "3.0 Home Edition", as Adobe released PhotoDeluxe Business Edition later that year for a higher price. PhotoDeluxe Home Edition, unofficially called PhotoDeluxe 4.0, was released in 1999 and was the last version of PhotoDeluxe to be released. Adobe officially cancelled PhotoDeluxe on July 8, 2002, citing the presence of Photoshop and Photoshop Elements, with support being officially cancelled in mid-2003. No version of PhotoDeluxe is compatible with Windows 10, rendering the program obsolete.

== Pricing ==
All home versions of PhotoDeluxe retailed for an MSRP of $49. PhotoDeluxe 2.0 and onwards allowed users to upgrade from a previous version of PhotoDeluxe or a competing piece of graphics software for $39. Additionally PhotoDeluxe Business Edition allowed a similar deal, allowing users to upgrade from other versions of PhotoDeluxe or a competing software for $59, instead of its normal price of $99. Adobe also offered a bundle allowing users of 1.0 or 2.0 to get 3.0 and Business Edition for $79.
