= Canvas X =

Drawing and imaging computer program

Canvas GFX
- Developer: Canvas GFX
- Release: November 1987; 38 years ago
- Stable release: Canvas X
- Operating system: Windows 7, Windows 8, Windows 8.1, Windows 10
- Platform: x64
- Available in: English and Japanese
- Type: Computer-aided design
- License: Trialware
- Website: canvasgfx.com

Canvas X is a drawing, imaging, and publishing computer program from Canvas GFX for personal computers.

== Development ==
Canvas GFX's origins date back to 1986. The original idea for Canvas came from Jorge Miranda, Manuel Menendez, and Joaquin DeSoto, the founders of Deneba Systems Inc. of Miami Florida, for Apple's Macintosh computers—part of the wave of programs that made the desktop publishing revolution.

The first version was unique in many ways; not least because it was released as both an application and a desk accessory. In the latter form, it could be used while another program, e.g. PageMaker, was running simultaneously; very handy in that time of single-program operation.

Canvas provides tools for creating and editing vector and raster graphics. It is used for illustration, page layout, animation, presentations, and publications in printed and World Wide Web formats.

From its inception, Canvas differed from other graphics applications because it combined tools and file formats for both vector graphics (line art) and raster images (photographic and other pixel-based), adding word-processing and page-layout features such as multiple-page documents and master pages in subsequent releases. The user works in a window, which is the familiar "page on a pasteboard" analog used by many DTP and vector graphics programs, but in that window, which might be a single illustration page or one page of a multi-page magazine, book, web site, animation or presentation, the user can create or edit and layout text, vector graphics and raster images. Canvas also emphasized technical drawing in addition to artistic illustration features.

With Version 3.5, Deneba went cross-platform, releasing a version with file-format compatibility for Macintosh and Windows computers. At Version 5, Canvas was completely rewritten for both platforms and included a QuickDraw 3D-based palette for creating 3D primitives and renderings. Version 7 of the software saw an internal extrusion engine being used instead of QuickDraw 3D.

At version 8, it was the first of the complex graphics programs to be "Carbonized" to run on both Classic and Mac OS X.

In April 2003, Deneba Systems was acquired by ACD Systems of Victoria, BC, Canada, the developers of Windows image editing and handling software such as ACDSee, before the release of version 9. Canvas development continued in Miami, under the aegis of ACD Systems of America. Later, in 2017, it was spun out as Canvas GFX.

With the introduction of Canvas 11, support for the Macintosh platform was dropped, making the application Windows-only.

Canvas is available in a standard and extended version. The once-optional Scientific Imaging module is now integrated into Canvas and provides enhanced input-output filters for file formats commonly used in science and engineering visualization. The geographic information system (GIS) module provides tools for use in mapping and GIS-based data analysis.

Following the release of the Windows-only Canvas X 16, Canvas Draw for Mac was released, reviving Macintosh support (though on a separate roadmap from the Windows version) after a decade-long hiatus.

While Canvas started out as a prosumer program in the general graphics/DTP market and continues to be the first (even only) tool of many professionals in such fields as graphics design, advertising, marketing, and DTP, it is less known in the consumer/prosumer market today than programs marketed by larger companies, such as Adobe Illustrator, Photoshop, and CorelDRAW. It has been better known in academic and commercial enterprises.

== Version history ==
Versions of Canvas public releases:

- Canvas 1.0 (Macintosh) – 1987
- Canvas 2.0 (Macintosh) – 1989
- Canvas 3.0 (Macintosh) – 1991
- Canvas 3.5 (Macintosh and Windows) – 1992
- Canvas 5 (Macintosh and Windows) – 1996
- Canvas 6 (Macintosh and Windows) – 1998
- Canvas 7 (Macintosh and Windows) – 1999
- Canvas 8 (Mac OS 9, Mac OS X, and Windows) – 2001
- Canvas 9 (Mac OS X and Windows) – 2003
- Canvas X (Mac OS X and Windows) – 2005
- Canvas 11 (Windows Vista) – 2007
- Canvas 12 (Windows XP, Vista, 7) – 2010
- Canvas 14 (Windows XP, Vista, 7, 8)
- Canvas 15 (Windows XP, Vista, 7, 8) – 20 November 2013
- Canvas X 16 (Windows 7, 8, 10) – November 2014
- Canvas Draw 1.0 (OS X 10.9, 10.10) – August 2015
- Canvas Draw 2.0 (OS X 10.9, 10.10, 10.11) – November 2015
- Canvas Draw 3.0 (OS X 10.10, 10.11, macOS 10.12) – June 2016
- Canvas X 2017 17.0 (Windows 7, 8, 10) – October 2016
- Canvas Draw 4.0 (OS X 10.11, macOS 10.12, 10.13) – June 2017
- Canvas X 2018 18.0 (Windows 7, 8, 10) – December 2017
- Canvas Draw 5.0 (macOS 10.12, 10.13, 10.14) – July 2018
- Canvas X 2019 19.0 (Windows 7, 8, 10) – November 2018
- Canvas Draw 6.0 (macOS 10.13, 10.14) – June 2019
- Canvas X 2020 20.0 (Windows 7, 8, 10) – October 2019
