= Pixlr =

Cloud-based image editing suite

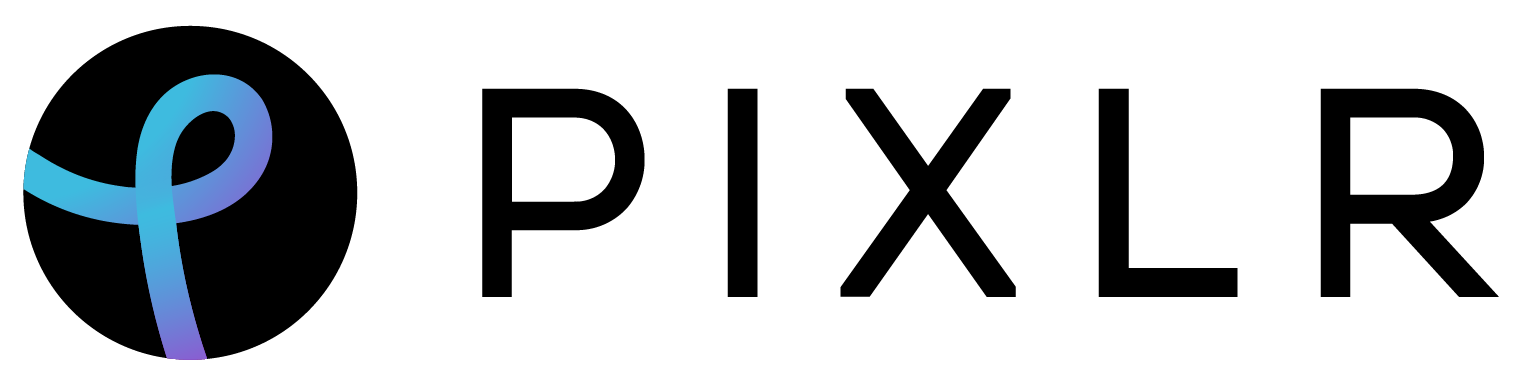
- Developer: Pixlr Pte. Ltd.
- Stable release: 2023 / November 2023; 2 years ago
- Platform: Web browser
- Available in: 30 languages
- List of languages Arabic, Brazilian, Croatian, Czech, Danish, Dutch, English, Finnish, French, German, Greek, Hebrew, Indonesian, Italian, Japanese, Korean, Malay, Polish, Portuguese, Romanian, Russian, Simplified Chinese, Slovenian, Spanish, Swedish, Thai, Traditional Chinese, Turkish, Ukrainian, Vietnamese
- Type: Online Photo Editing and Graphic Tools
- License: software as a service
- Website: pixlr.com

Pixlr is a group of SaaS creative tools including Pixlr.com, Designs.ai and Vectr.com. Pixlr.com is a cloud-based set of image editing tools and utilities, including AI image generation and enhancements.

The Pixlr suite targets users who require subjectively simple, or more advanced, photo editing as well as graphic design. It features a freemium business model with subscription plans—Plus, Premium and Teams.

The platform can be used on desktop and also smartphones and tablets. Pixlr is compatible with various image formats such as JPEG, PNG, WEBP, GIF, PSD (Photoshop Document) and PXZ (native Pixlr document format).

Designs.ai lets users create content using AI, with a goal of being within two minutes, across different media types including videos, text, banners and audio.

Vectr.com was acquired in 2017 before being spun out into Pixlr Group in 2023.

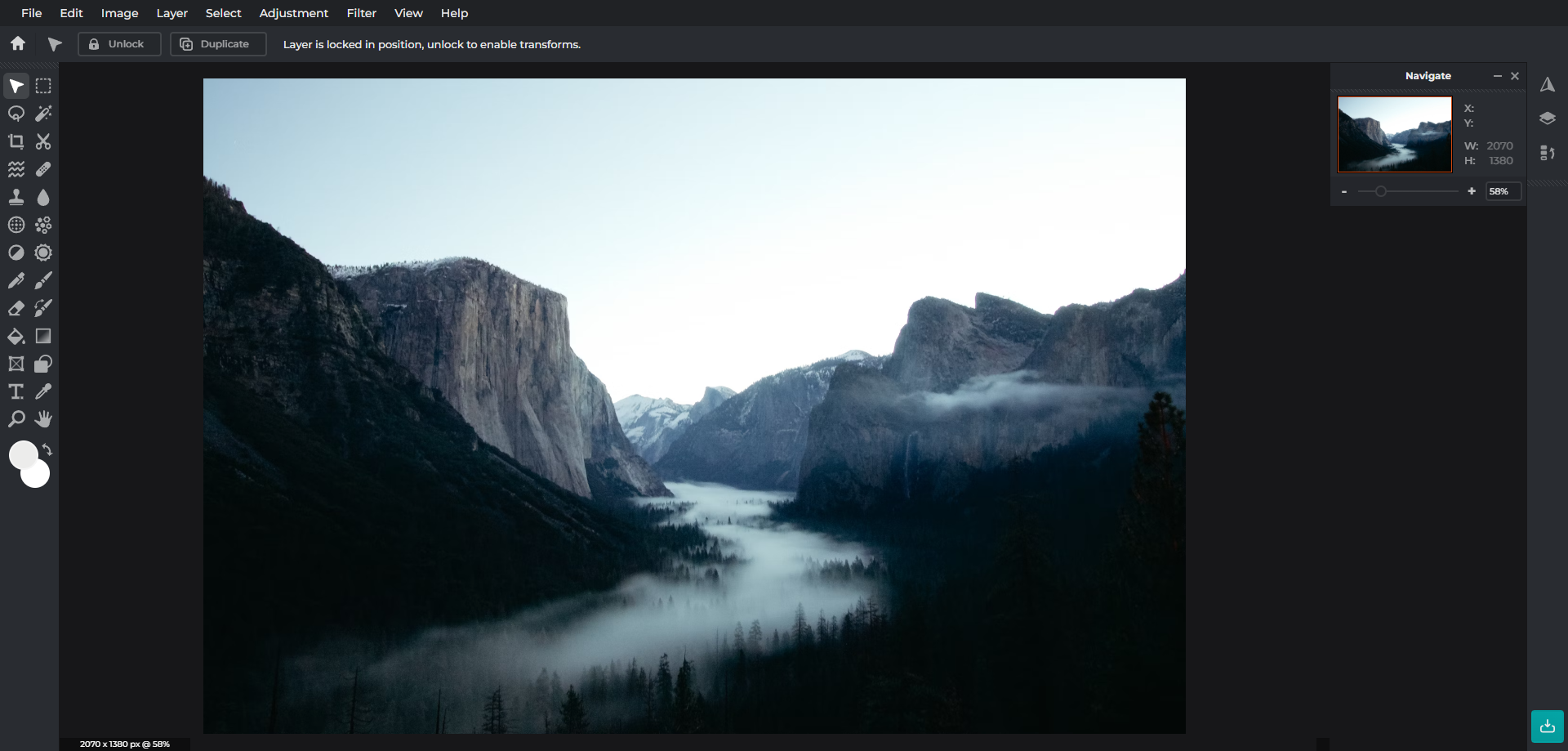
An example of the Pixlr E workspace.

== History ==
Pixlr was founded in 2008 and built on Macromedia Flash. On 19 July 2011, Autodesk announced that they had acquired the Pixlr suite. In 2013, Time listed Pixlr as one of the top 50 websites of the year.

In 2017, Pixlr was acquired from Autodesk. It was subsequently rebuilt and relaunched in HTML5 in 2019. In September 2023, Pixlr was awarded as the Top 13 GenAi Web Product by the world's top venture firm Andreessen Horowitz.

In November 2023, Pixlr, Designs.ai and Vectr were combined as a new business group named Pixlr Group focusing on generative AI and creative software solutions.

In May 2024, Pixlr was featured as one of the top 18 progressive web applications highlighted on Google I/O.

== Versions ==
Pixlr.com rebranded itself as a full creative suite in 2019 by introducing Pixlr X, Pixlr E and Pixlr M.

The platform introduced more features in December 2021 with a new logo and added tools which included: Brushes, the 'Heal tool', Animation, and Batch upload. The brush feature enables the creation of hand-drawn effects. The Heal tool allows users to remove unwanted objects from their images whereas the Animation feature can be used to include movements into their edits. Users can also utilize Batch upload to edit up to 50 images simultaneously.

In November 2022, Pixlr 2023 was launched, adding more tools such as "AI smart resize", colorization, text wrapping and other additional effects.

In November 2023, Pixlr 2024 was launched with Pixlr Designer and new AI-powered updates which includes AI image generation, AI infill, AI inpainting and more.
