= OpenRaster =

Image file format

- Filename extension: .ora
- Internet media type: image/openraster
- Latest release: 0.0.6 (draft)
- Type of format: Layered raster graphics
- Extended from: OpenDocument
- Open format?: Yes
- Website: OpenRaster Specification at openraster.org

OpenRaster is a file format proposed for the common exchange of layered images between raster graphics editors. It is meant as a replacement for later versions of the Adobe PSD format. OpenRaster is still in development and so far is supported by a few programs. The default file extension for OpenRaster files is ".ora".

== Background ==
The Adobe Photoshop PSD file format was widely used as a cross-application file format for layered images. Adobe allowed this by releasing the format's specifications publicly. In 2006 Adobe changed this license to only grant access to and use of the specifications and documentation "for the purposes of internally developing Developer Programs in connection with Adobe Software products and incorporating portions or all of the Sample Code into Developer Programs." In response to these restrictions, the OpenRaster format was proposed by KDE and Krita developers Boudewijn Rempt at the first Libre Graphics Meeting at Lyon, France in the spring of 2006 and is drawn from the Open Document Format.
