= HDR PhotoStudio =

Discontinued graphics application

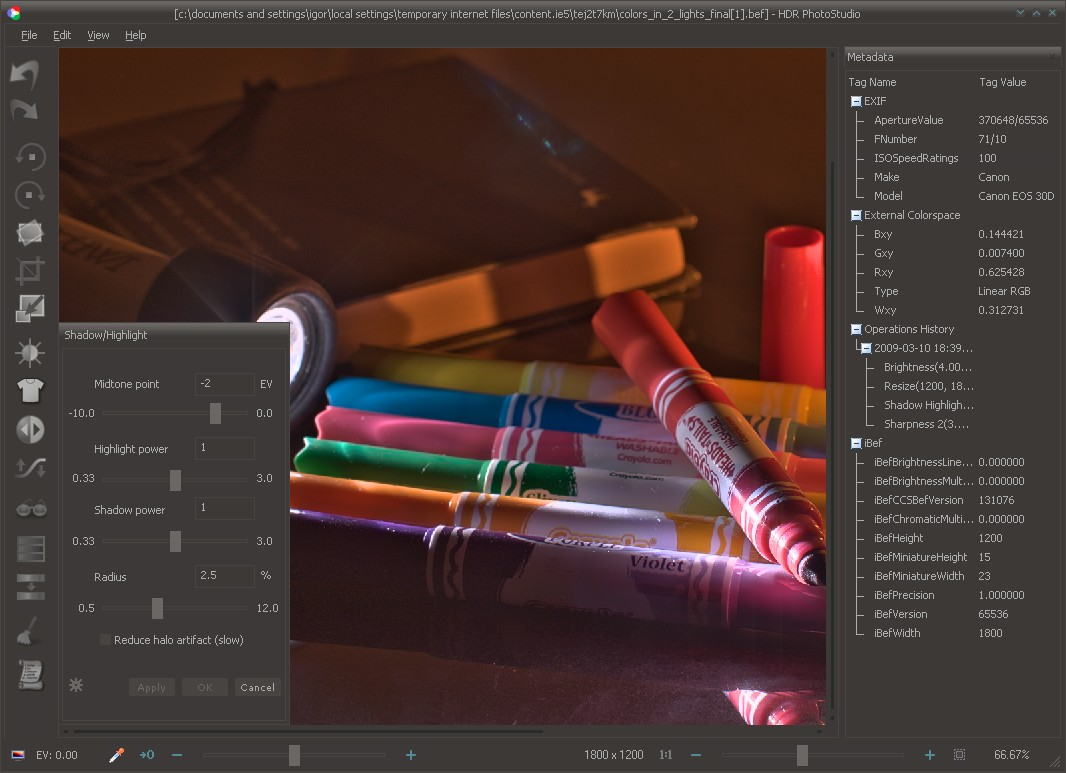
- HDR PhotoStudio screenshot
- Developer(s): Unified Color
- Final release: 2.15.42 / March 2010; 15 years ago
- Operating system: Microsoft Windows
- Type: High dynamic range imaging
- License: Proprietary
- Website: www.unifiedcolor.com

HDR PhotoStudio is a discontinued high dynamic range (HDR) graphics application developed by Unified Color for the Windows and macOS operating systems. In addition to being a HDR-merge application, HDR PhotoStudio offered a set of image editing operations that worked in its dynamic range (the website showed an example of processing an image with 1,000,000:1 contrast ratio), human color range (gamut), and in high precision (32-bit floating point). It also had a Color Integrity feature that enabled preserving an image's color tone during image editing operations — for example changing an image's contrast would not change its chromatic (color tone) data. This problem is usually referred to as "color shift".

HDR PhotoStudio implemented an advanced HDR image compression format called BEF, and a plug-in for opening and saving files in Adobe Photoshop was also included with the application. HDR PhotoStudio was discontinued in July 2010.

BEF is an HDR image format developed by Unified Color. The BEF format can archive image data with any dynamic range, full human color range, and a quality setting directly tied to color data precision; the used techniques ties it with JND — just noticeable difference parameter.

== Features ==
- Unified Color model: support for merging and editing HDR images with any dynamic range, human color range, and Color Integrity (to avoid "color shift" issue).
- Support for RAW camera formats.
- Support for import HDR images from Radiance HDR and OpenEXR formats.
- An advanced technique of HDR data rendering.
- Scripting support via image recipe.
- Halo removal technique.
- Powerful noise elimination.
- 32-bit/channel floating point high precision representation of image data (96 bit/pixel).
- Multi-core processors support.
