= Iridient Developer =

Raw image format processing software for macOS

- Developer(s): Iridient Digital
- Initial release: December 2004; 20 years ago
- Stable release: 3.6 / March 9, 2021; 4 years ago
- Operating system: macOS
- Type: Photo post-production
- License: Proprietary
- Website: iridient.com/products/

Iridient Developer, formerly Iridient RAW Developer, is a commercial and proprietary raw image format processing software for macOS.

It is noted for its ability to process Fujifilm X-Trans raw files, and being one of the first to be able to generate sharp images from them. It claims to support 620 cameras, including, as of March 2015, all Sigma cameras except the Quattro generation. It was first released to the public in December 2004.
