= KolourPaint =

Free open-source raster graphics editor

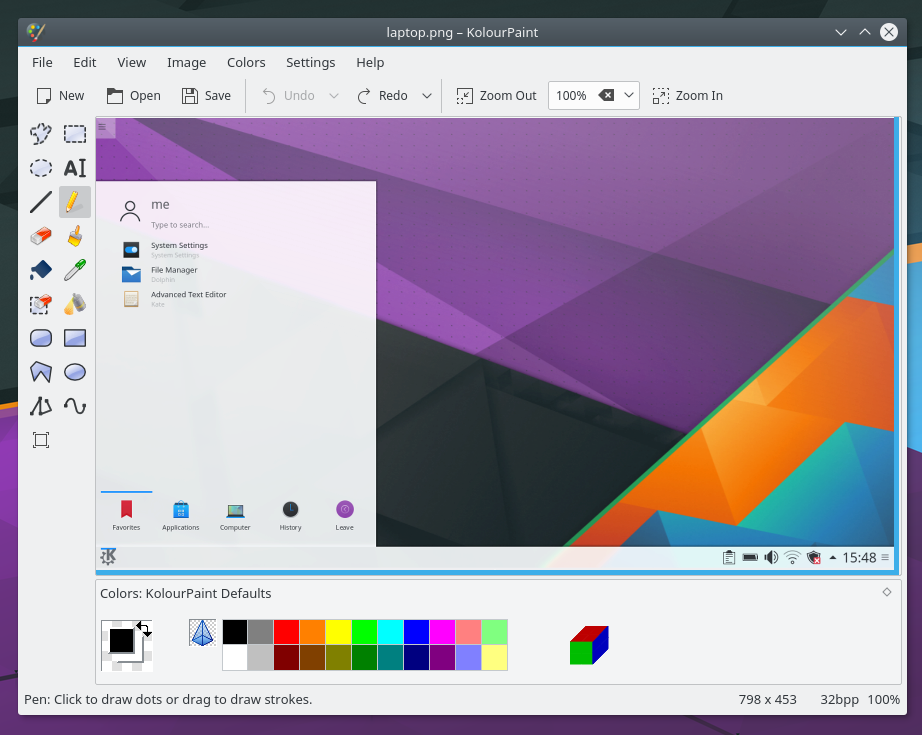
- Developer: KDE
- Stable release: 25.08.0 / 7 August 2025
- Written in: C++
- Operating system: Unix-like
- Type: Raster graphics editor
- License: BSD license, LGPL-2.0+, GFDL-1.2
- Website: apps.kde.org/kolourpaint/
- Repository: invent.kde.org/graphics/kolourpaint

KolourPaint is a free and open-source raster graphics editor by KDE. It is similar to Microsoft Paint before the version shipped with Windows 7, but has some additional features such as support for transparency, color balance and image rotation.

It aims to be conceptually simple to understand, providing a level of functionality targeted towards the average user. KolourPaint is designed for casual work such as:

- Painting: drawing diagrams and "finger painting"
- Image Manipulation: editing screenshots and photos; applying effects
- Icon Editing: drawing clipart and logos with transparency

In version K Desktop Environment 3.3, KolourPaint replaced KPaint as the standard simple painting application.

KolourPaint has a port to Microsoft Windows as part of the KDE on Windows initiative. KolourPaint also has ports to MacOS.

== See also ==
- Comparison of raster graphics editors
- Microsoft Paint
