= Elementary OS =

Desktop operating system based on Ubuntu

elementary OS

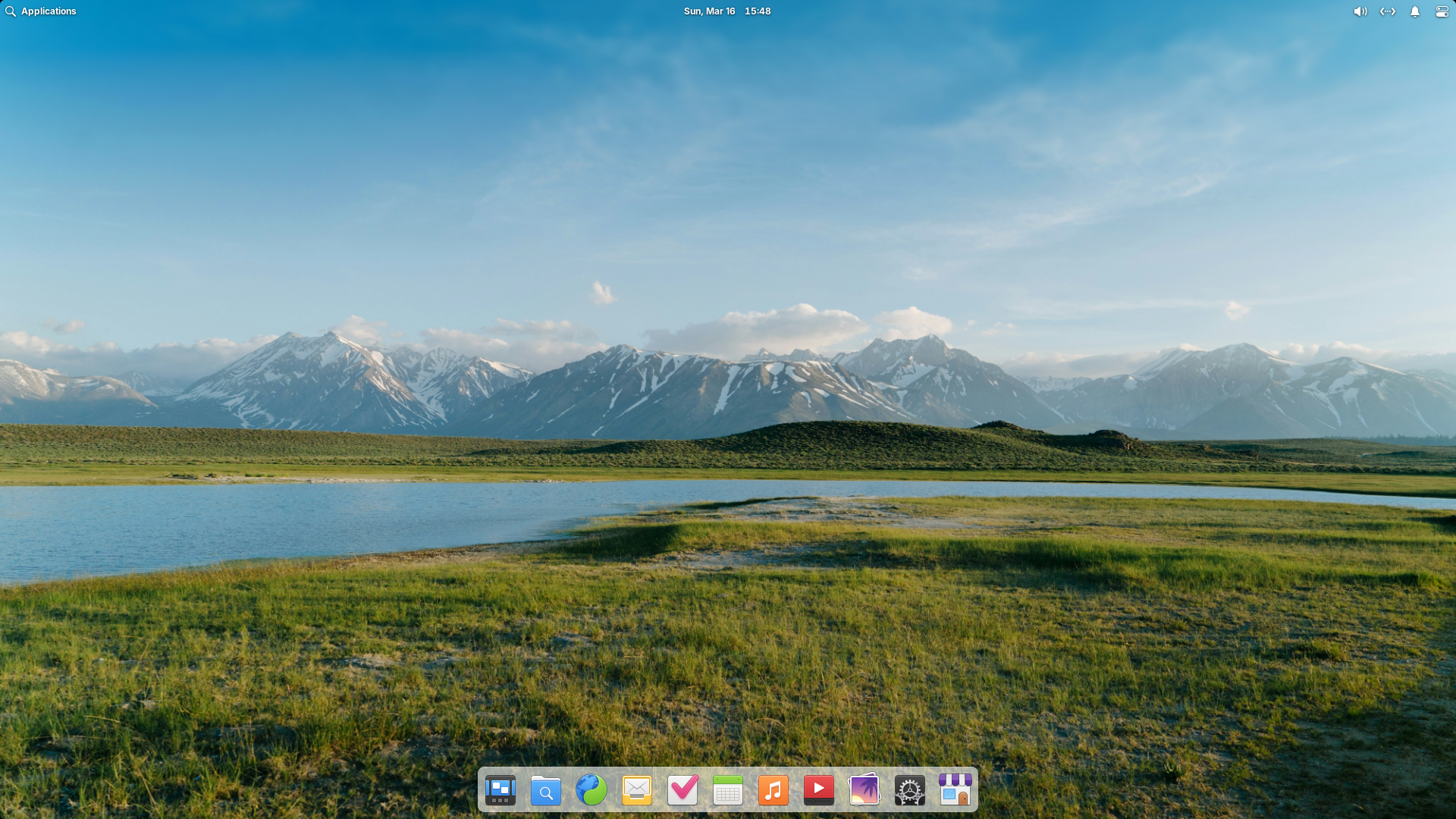
- elementary OS 8.0 "Circe"
- Developer: elementary, Inc
- OS family: Linux (Unix-like)
- Working state: Current
- Source model: Open source
- Initial release: 31 March 2011; 15 years ago
- Latest release: 8.1.1 / 26 February 2026; 7 months ago
- Repository: github.com/elementary
- Update method: Long-term support
- Package manager: APT (command-line frontend) dpkg (backend); Flatpak
- Supported platforms: AMD64
- Kernel type: Monolithic (Linux kernel)
- Userland: GNU
- Default user interface: Pantheon
- License: GPLv3
- Official website: elementary.io

Elementary OS (stylized as elementary OS) is a Linux distribution based on Ubuntu LTS. It promotes itself as "thoughtful, capable, and ethical computing" and has a pay-what-you-want model. The operating system, the desktop environment (called Pantheon), and accompanying applications are developed and maintained by elementary, Inc.

== Design philosophy ==
The human interface guidelines of the elementary OS project focus on immediate usability with a gentle learning curve, rather than full-fledged customization. The three core rules the developers set for themselves were "concision", "accessible configuration" and "minimal documentation".

Since its inception, elementary OS has received praise and criticism for its design. Wired claimed that it closely resembled macOS, visually and in user experience. The elementary developers say that while it may look like macOS at first, they have a lot of differences.

Pantheon's main shell is deeply integrated with other elementary OS applications, Web (the default web browser based on GNOME Web) and Code (a simple text editor). Pantheon uses Gala as its window manager, which is based on Mutter.

== Pantheon desktop environment ==
The Pantheon desktop environment is built on top of the GNOME software base, i.e. GTK, GDK, GtkSourceView, Clutter (software), Cairo, GLib, (including GObject and GIO), GVfs, Vala and Tracker. The desktop allows for multiple workspaces to organize the user's workflow.

Pantheon initiated and maintains:

- libgranite – a companion library for GTK and GLib. Among other things, libgranite provides complex widgets and convenience functions designed for use in apps built for elementary OS.
  The dependencies of libgranite version 7.8 are: valac, sassc, meson, gobject-introspection, gettext, libgee-0.8-dev, libgirepository1.0-dev and libgtk-4-dev >= 4.12.0.

Pantheon applications that are designed and developed by elementary include:

- Pantheon Greeter: session manager based on LightDM
- Gala: window manager
- Wingpanel: top panel, similar in function to GNOME Shell's top panel
- Slingshot: application launcher located in WingPanel
- Switchboard: settings application (or control panel)
- Pantheon Mail: e-mail client written in Vala and based on WebKitGTK
- Photos: A fork of Shotwell (software)
- Calendar: desktop calendar
- Music: audio player
- Code: code-focused text editor, comparable to gedit or leafpad.
- Terminal: terminal emulator
- Files (formerly called Marlin): file manager
- Installer: Installer built in partnership with System76.

Bryan Lunduke of Network World wrote that the Pantheon desktop environment, elementary OS's centerpiece, was among the best of 2016. Pantheon is also being released as an optional work-in-progress desktop environment in GeckoLinux. In addition to its x86 installer, Elementary offers various experimental builds that run on ARM devices such as the Pinebook Pro and Raspberry Pi 4.

== Development ==
The elementary OS distribution started as a set of themes and applications designed for Ubuntu which later became its own Linux distribution. Being Ubuntu-based, it is compatible with its repositories and packages, and prior to version 0.4 "Loki", it used the Ubuntu software centre to handle software installation and uninstallation. However, after the release of Loki, Elementary bundled their own app store, AppCenter, whose user interface is designed to be intuitive for new users without consuming excessive resources.

elementary OS is based on Ubuntu's Long Term Support releases, which Ubuntu's developers actively maintain for bugs and security for years even as development continues on the next release.

elementary OS founder Danielle Foré has said that the project is not designed to compete with existing open source projects, but to expand their reach. It also seeks to create open source jobs through developer "bounties" on specific tasks. As of the 2016 Loki release, US$17,500 in bounties had been raised.

=== 0.1 Jupiter ===
The first stable version of elementary OS was Jupiter, published on 31 March 2011 and based on Ubuntu 10.10.

=== 0.2 Luna ===
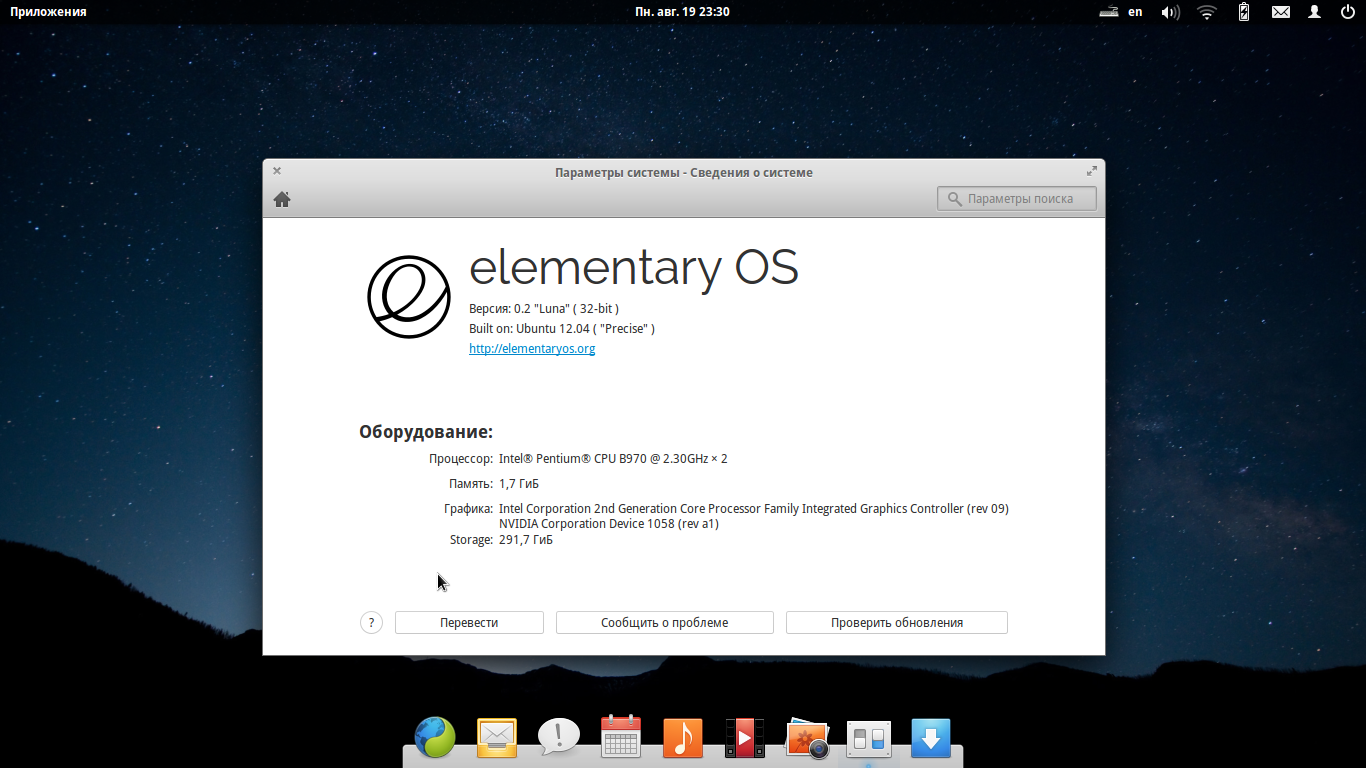
elementary OS 0.2 "Luna"

In November 2012, the first beta version of elementary OS code-named Luna was released, which uses Ubuntu 12.04 LTS as a base. The second beta version of Luna was released on 6 May 2013, carrying more than 300 bug fixes and several changes, such as improved support for multiple localizations, multiple display support and updated applications. On 7 August 2013, a countdown clock appeared on the official website with a countdown to 10 August 2013. The second stable version of elementary OS, Luna, was released that same day, along with a complete overhaul and redesign of the elementary OS website.

=== 0.3 Freya ===
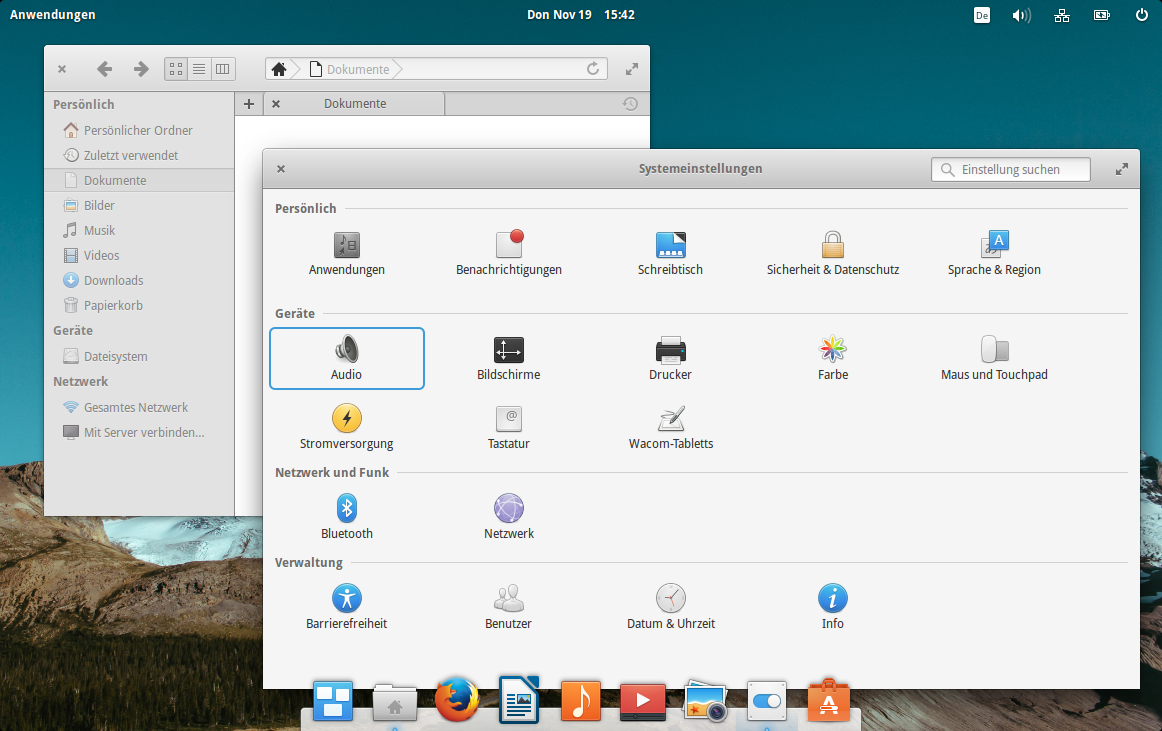
elementary OS 0.3 "Freya"

The name of the third stable version of elementary OS, Isis, was proposed in August 2013 by Danielle Foré, the project leader. It was later changed to Freya to avoid association with the terrorist group ISIS. It is based on Ubuntu 14.04 LTS, which was released in April 2014. The first beta of Freya was released on 11 August 2014. The second beta of Freya was released on 8 February 2015. The final version was released on 11 April 2015, after a countdown clock appeared on the website eight days earlier.

Freya was downloaded 1.2 million times. In line with Elementary's intent to expand the reach of open source software, 73 percent of Freya downloads were from closed source operating systems.

In 2015, the elementary OS developers changed the download page to default to a monetary amount before providing a direct HTTP download for the current stable release. Despite the fact that the user could specify any amount, or no amount at all, it sparked controversy about how such practices are typically not perceived as being in alignment with FOSS distribution philosophies. The elementary OS team has defended the action stating that "Around 99.875% of those users download without paying", and that it is needed to ensure the continued development of the distribution.

In a review of all Linux distributions, Linux.com gave elementary OS their "best-looking distro" superlative in early 2016. The reviewer noted its developers' design background, their influence from Mac OS X, and their philosophy of prioritizing strict design rules and applications that follow these rules.

=== 0.4 Loki ===
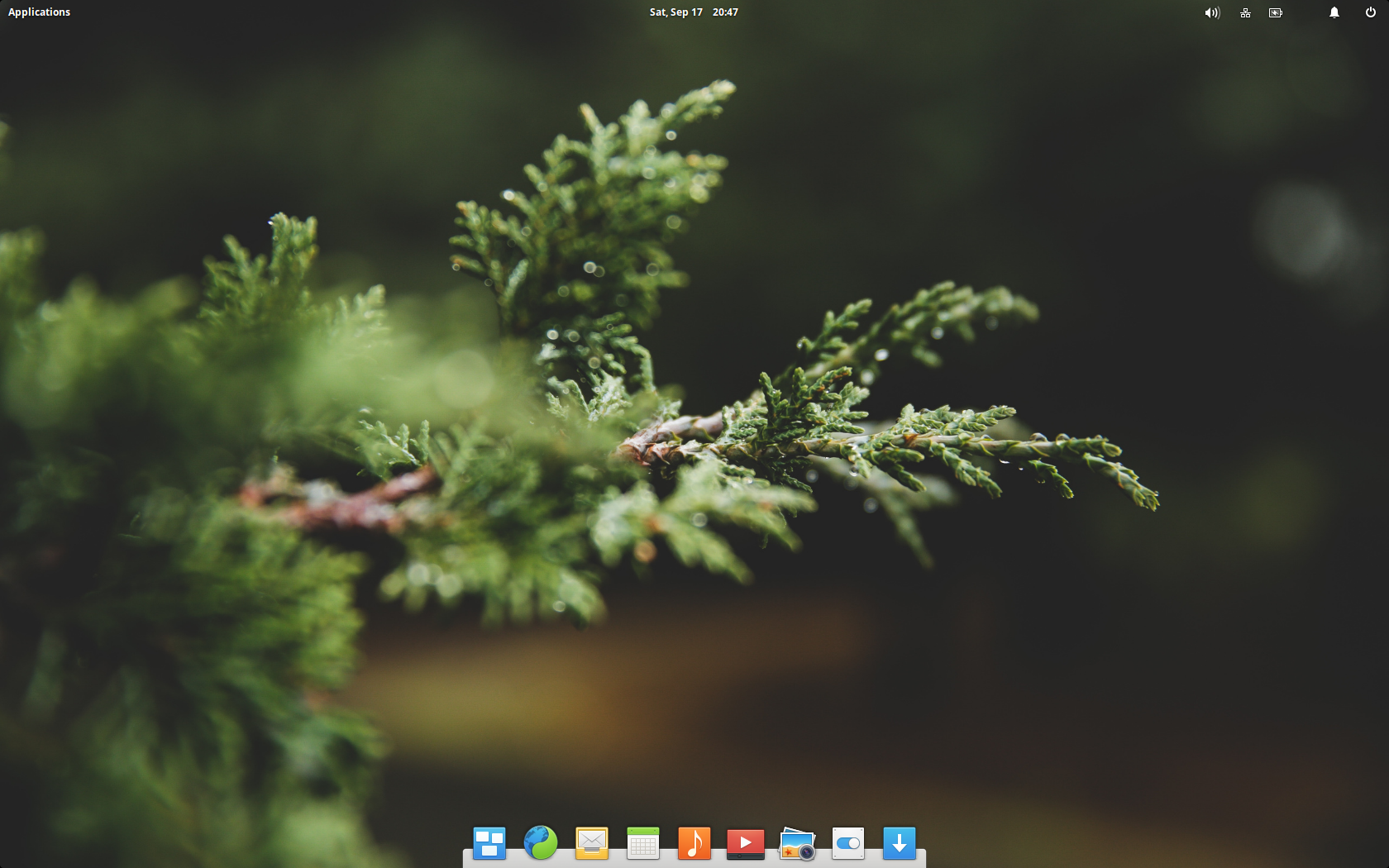
elementary OS 0.4 "Loki"

elementary OS 0.4, known by its codename "Loki", was released on 9 September 2016. Loki was built atop the Ubuntu "long-term support" version released earlier in the year (Note: Ubuntu 16.04 LTS, Xenial Xerus, was supported until 2021.) and its updated kernel (4.4). Loki revamped the operating system's notifications and added multiple new pieces of standard software. It let users set notification display preferences. Updated notification menu bar indicators began to display information from the notification—such as the title of an email—rather than a general alert. The operating system also added a system-wide integration for online accounts for Last.fm and FastMail, with other services in development.

Loki replaced Freya's Midori web browser with GNOME Web, a WebKit2-based browser with better performance. After the Yorba Foundation which developed the Geary email client was dissolved, elementary OS forked Geary as "Mail" and added new visual and integration features. In a new calendar feature, users could describe events in natural language, which the calendar program interprets and places into the proper time and description fields when creating events.

elementary OS also created its own app store that simplifies the process of installing and updating applications. Project founder Danielle Foré called the AppCenter the biggest feature in the Loki release, and noted its speed improvement over other installation methods and internal development benefits for departing from Ubuntu's upgrade tools. Loki developers received $9,000 in bounties during its development—nearly half of the project's total bounty fundraising.

Jack Wallen of Linux.com praised Loki as being among the most elegant and best-designed Linux desktops. He found the web browser and app store changes to be significant improvements, and the email client revamp "a much-needed breath of fresh air" in a stagnating field. Overall, Wallen surmised that existing users would appreciate Loki's polish and new users would find it to be a perfect introduction to the operating system. Bryan Lunduke of Network World lauded Loki's performance, usability, polish, and easy installation, but considered it a better fit for new Linux users than for those already established.

The elementary OS team received a large donation from an anonymous donor in early August 2018. The donation has allowed the development team to hire an additional full-time employee and expand long-term viability for the project.

=== 5.0 Juno ===
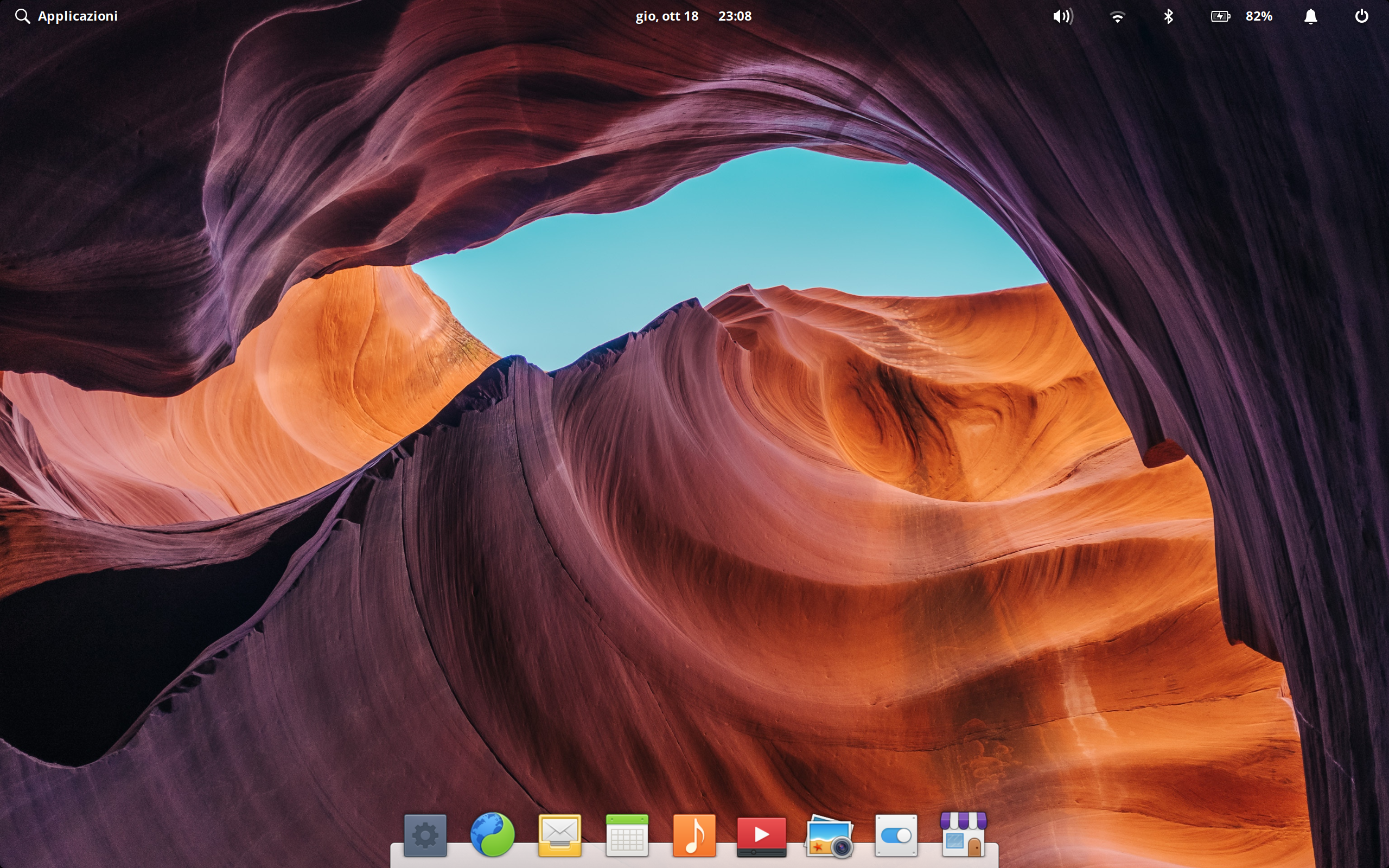
elementary OS 5.0 "Juno"

elementary OS 5.0, known by its codename "Juno", was released on 16 October 2018. The shift in version numbering was explained by founder Danielle Foré as being primarily intended to avoid causing confusion among new users into thinking the OS was still in pre-stable development. The update brings changes to the AppCenter pay-what-you-want system, as well a Night Light feature for changing the screen color at night, and adjustable window tiling as well as several other new features for the Pantheon desktop and elementary OS applications. The update also contained a new Housekeeping feature in settings, which removes trashed, as well as temporary, files after a given time interval.

Jack Wallen, writing for TechRepublic, praised the update for bringing subtle changes and improving upon Loki. Jason Evangelho, writing for Forbes, called the update elegant, stating that "elementary OS 5.0 Juno, thus far, does just work. And looks absolutely beautiful doing it." In a review from LinuxInsider, the reviewer called the operating system a "very solid Linux distro" despite criticizing it for lacking power-user features.

As of November 2018, Juno has been downloaded over 160,000 times, with 1% of people choosing to pay (with $10 being the most common amount, followed closely by $1)

As part of an October 2019 update, elementary OS started supporting Flatpak out of the box, thereby making it easier to install any of the wide array of Flatpak apps that are available.

=== 5.1 Hera ===
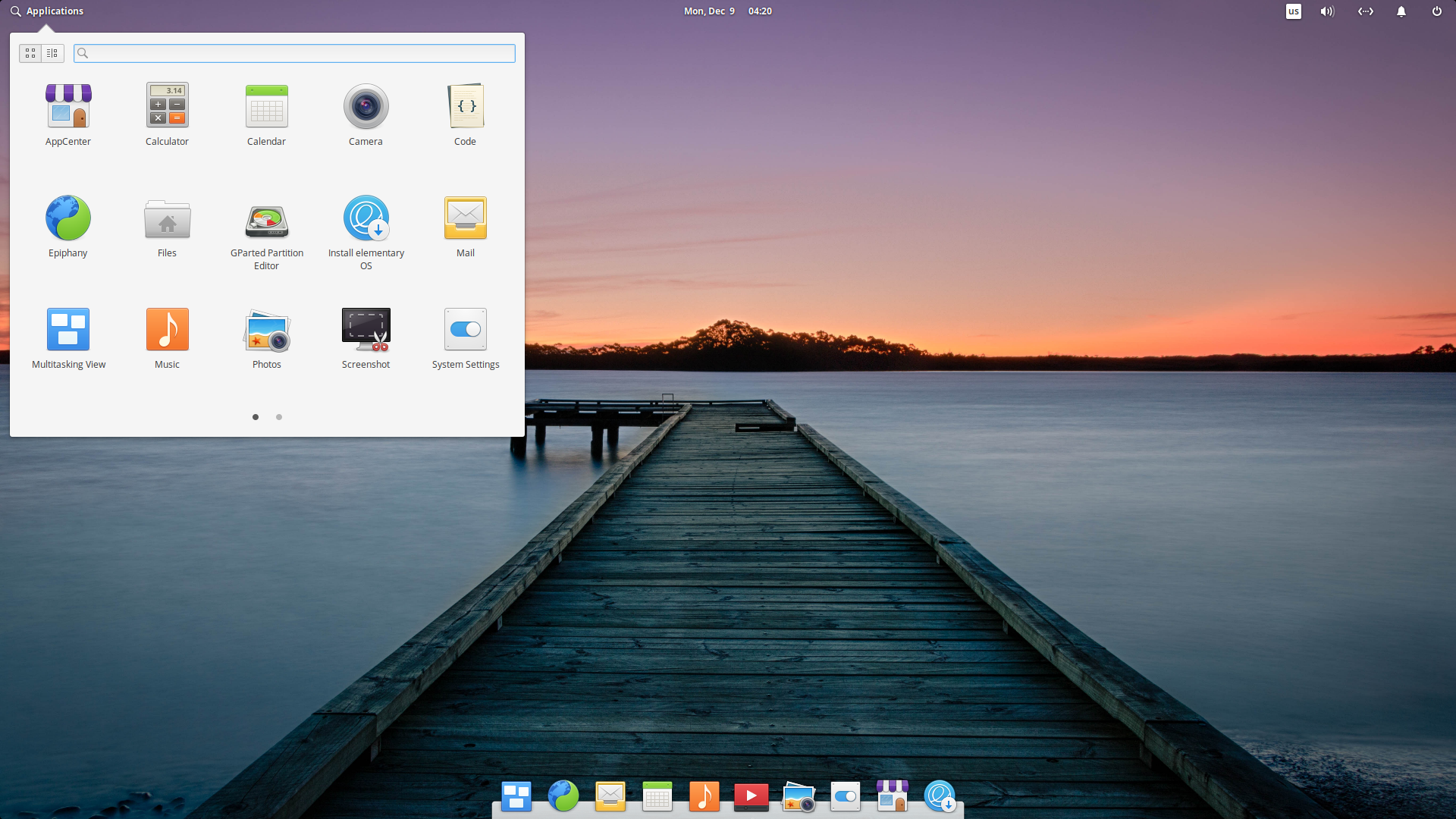
elementary OS 5.1 "Hera"

Development of elementary OS 5.1 “Hera” began after the release of elementary OS 5.0 “Juno” and focused on refining the user experience, improving performance, and introducing new features.

The development team started by addressing various bugs and stability issues present in the previous version. They put great emphasis on enhancing system performance and optimizing resource usage to ensure a smoother overall experience. One of the key goals of “Hera” was to make elementary OS even more responsive and efficient.

In terms of visual improvements, the team refined the existing desktop environment, Pantheon, and its accompanying applications. The design language was further polished, resulting in a more polished and consistent look throughout the system. Several system icons and styles were updated, giving “Hera” a more refined appearance.

The Files (formerly known as Nautilus) file manager received attention during development, with improvements in performance and a cleaner interface. Additionally, the team introduced a revamped Applications menu, making it easier to navigate and find installed software.

=== 6.0 Odin ===
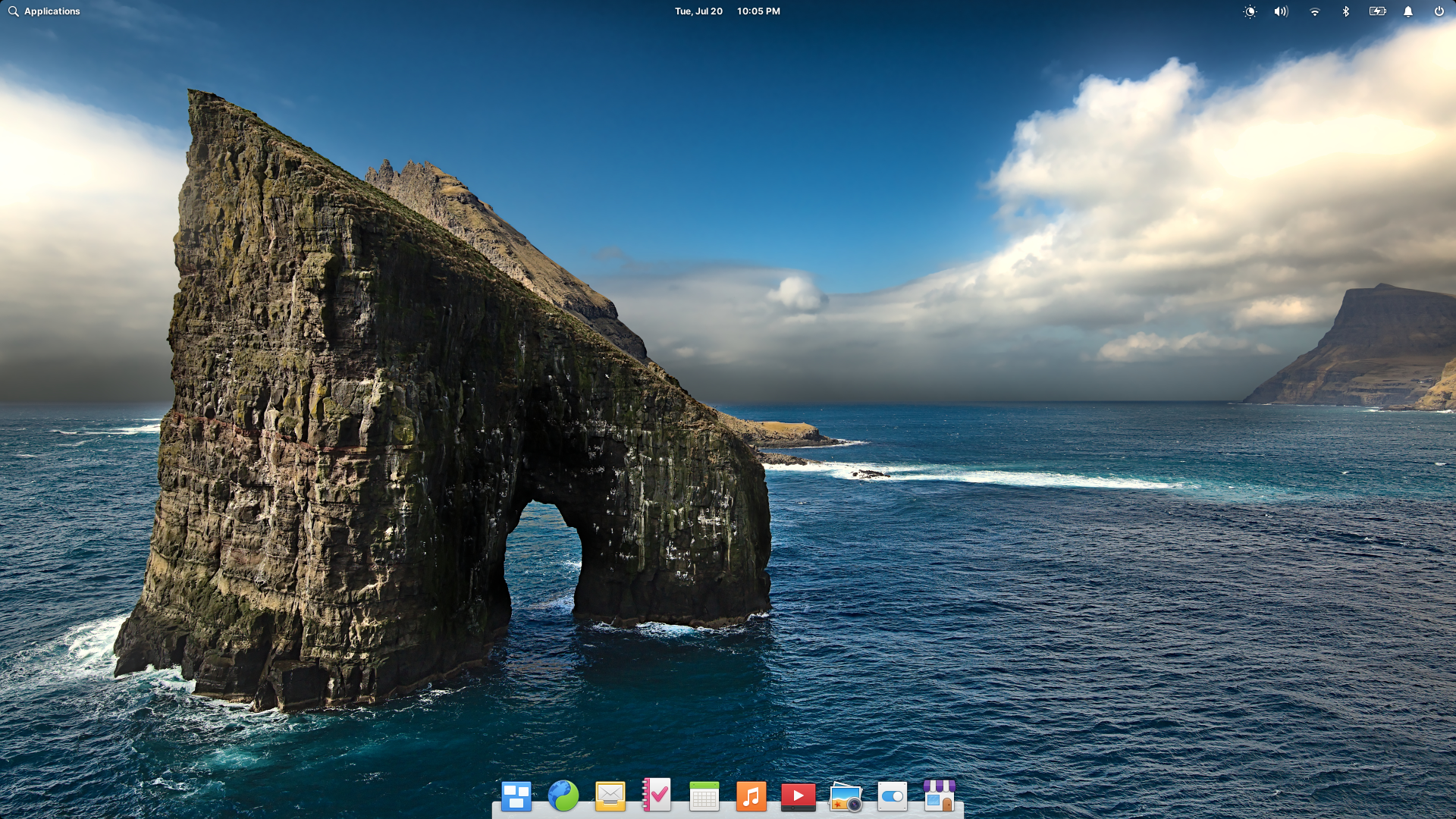
elementary OS 6.0 "Odin"

elementary OS 6.0, released on 10 August 2021 under the codename "Odin", builds upon 5.1 Hera by including new features like a dark style and the ability to change the accent color, Improved notification handling and a new Notification Center, Online accounts for things like IMAP and CalDAV for email and calendar respectively, Multi-touch Gestures for app switching and multiple desktops, an all new installer, a firmware updates app and more.

=== 6.1 Jólnir ===
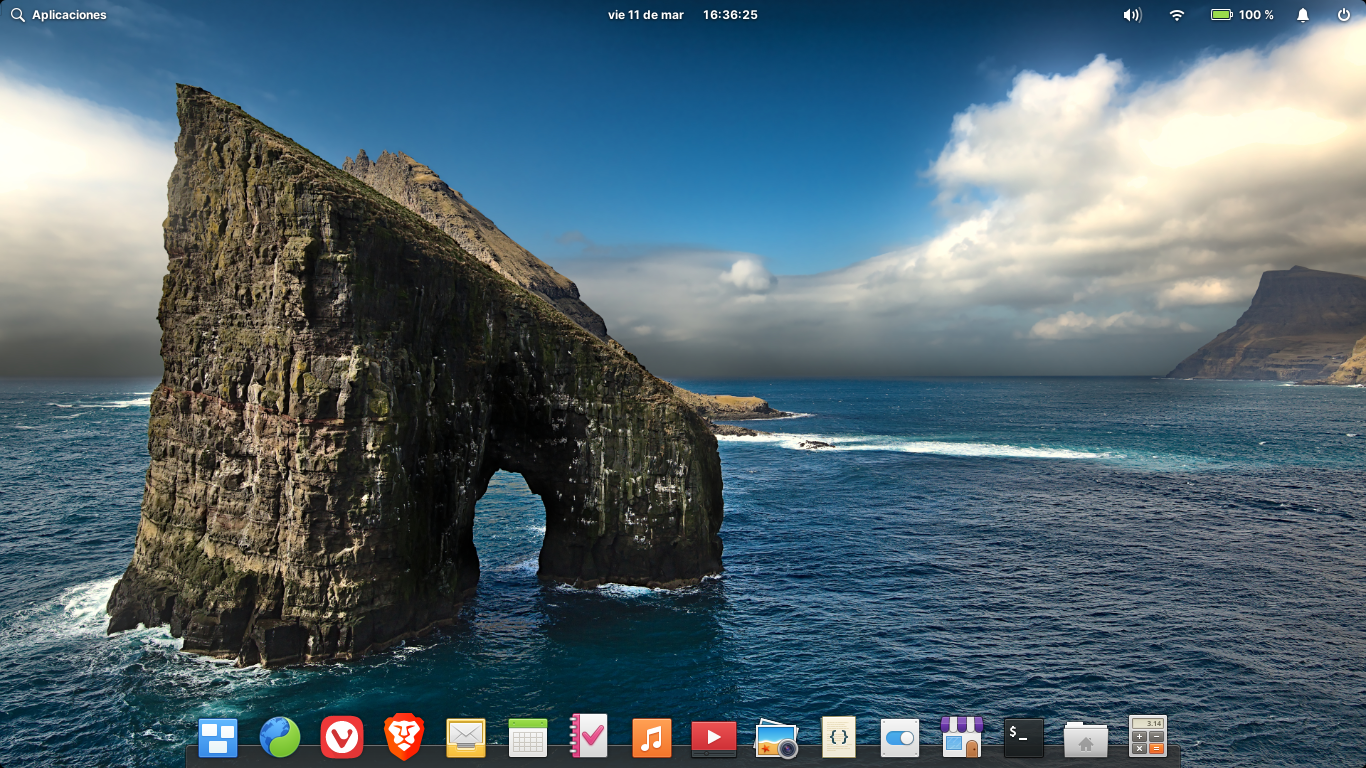
elementary OS 6.1 "Jólnir"

elementary 6.1, code name "Jólnir", was released on 20 December 2021.

==== Change of ownership ====
When 6.0 and 6.1 were released, the pay model wasn't bringing in enough revenue. After legal challenges between the two co-founders, Cassidy James Blaede decided to sell 100% of their shares to Danielle Foré. The CFO, Liz Kecso, also left the company while these issues were happening.

=== 7.0 Horus ===
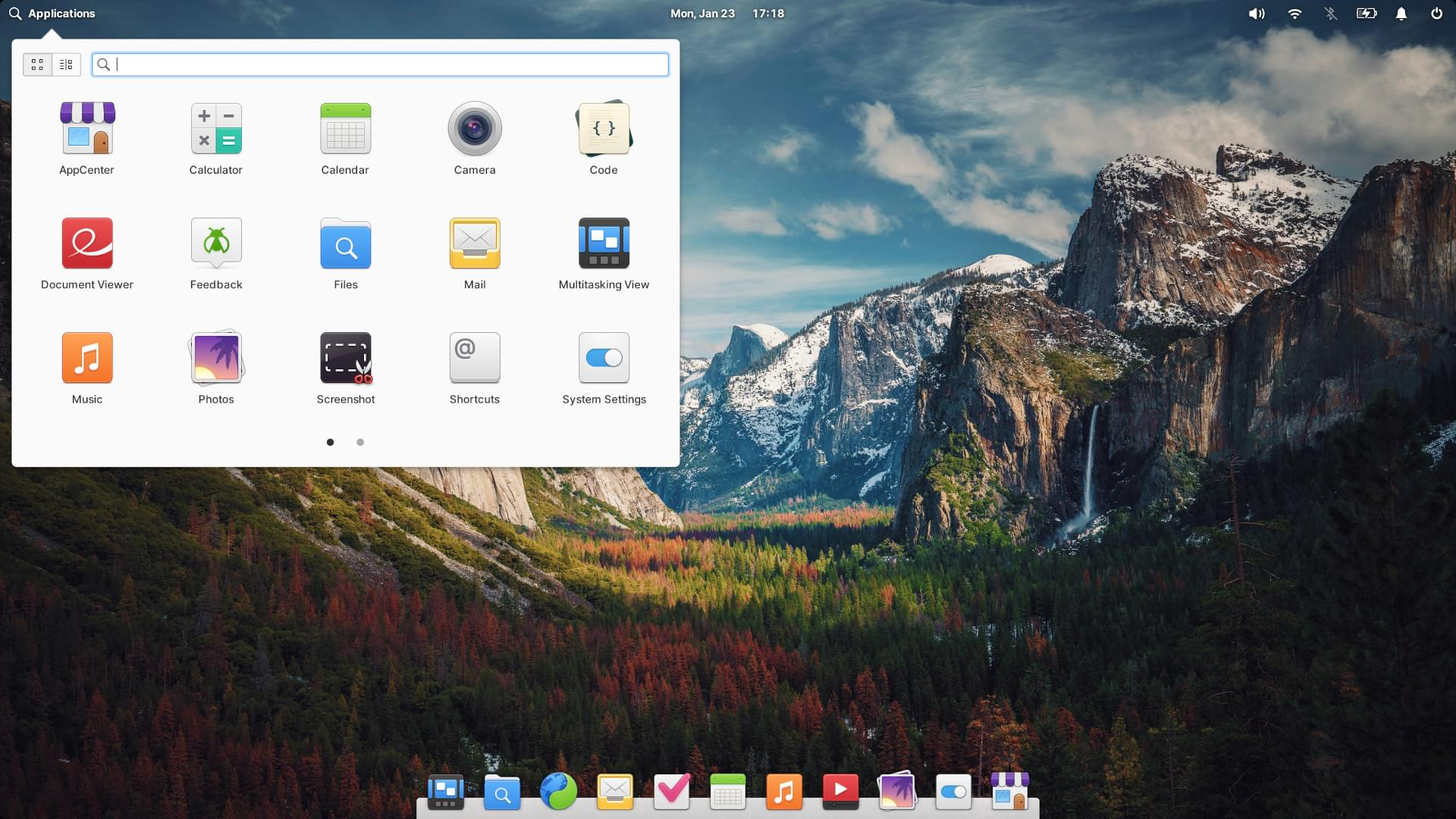
elementary OS 7.0 "Horus"

elementary OS 7.0 "Horus" was released on 31 January 2023. The update focuses on the AppCenter, new features and settings, and the developer platform. This version is based on Ubuntu 22.04 LTS.

=== 8.x Circe ===
elementary OS 8.0 "Circe" was released on 26 November 2024. The update introduced improved multitasking, default Flathub integration, and user interface changes focused on inclusive design. It is based on Ubuntu 24.04 LTS.

On 22 December 2025, elementary OS 8.1 was released. This version transitioned the Wayland-based "Secure Session" to be the default environment. Key hardware improvements included the introduction of official ARM64 builds for UEFI devices and support for fractional display scaling. The update also added two new default applications: "Monitor", a system resource utility, and "Maps". Visual refinements featured a "blur-behind" effect for translucent elements like the Dock and notifications, as well as a workspace switcher integrated directly into the Dock. It shipped with Linux kernel 6.14 and Mesa 25.

=== Summary table ===
Version	Codename	Release date	Base
0.1	Jupiter	31 March 2011	Ubuntu 10.10 (maverick)
0.2	Luna	10 August 2013	Ubuntu 12.04 LTS (precise)
0.3	Freya	11 April 2015	Ubuntu 14.04 LTS (trusty)
0.3.1	Freya	3 September 2015	Ubuntu 14.04 LTS (trusty)
0.3.2	Freya	9 December 2015	Ubuntu 14.04 LTS (trusty)
0.4	Loki	9 September 2016	Ubuntu 16.04 LTS (xenial)
0.4.1	Loki	17 May 2017	Ubuntu 16.04.2 LTS (xenial)
5.0	Juno	16 October 2018	Ubuntu 18.04 LTS (bionic)
5.1	Hera	3 December 2019	Ubuntu 18.04 LTS (bionic)
6.0	Odin	10 August 2021	Ubuntu 20.04 LTS (focal)
6.1	Jólnir	20 December 2021	Ubuntu 20.04 LTS (focal)
7.0	Horus	31 January 2023	Ubuntu 22.04 LTS (jammy)
7.1	Horus	3 October 2023	Ubuntu 22.04 LTS (jammy)
8.0	Circe	26 November 2024	Ubuntu 24.04 LTS (noble)
8.1	Circe	22 December 2025	Ubuntu 24.04.3 LTS (noble)

Legend:
Unsupported
Supported
Latest version
Future version
