= Geary (e-mail client) =

Open-source email client

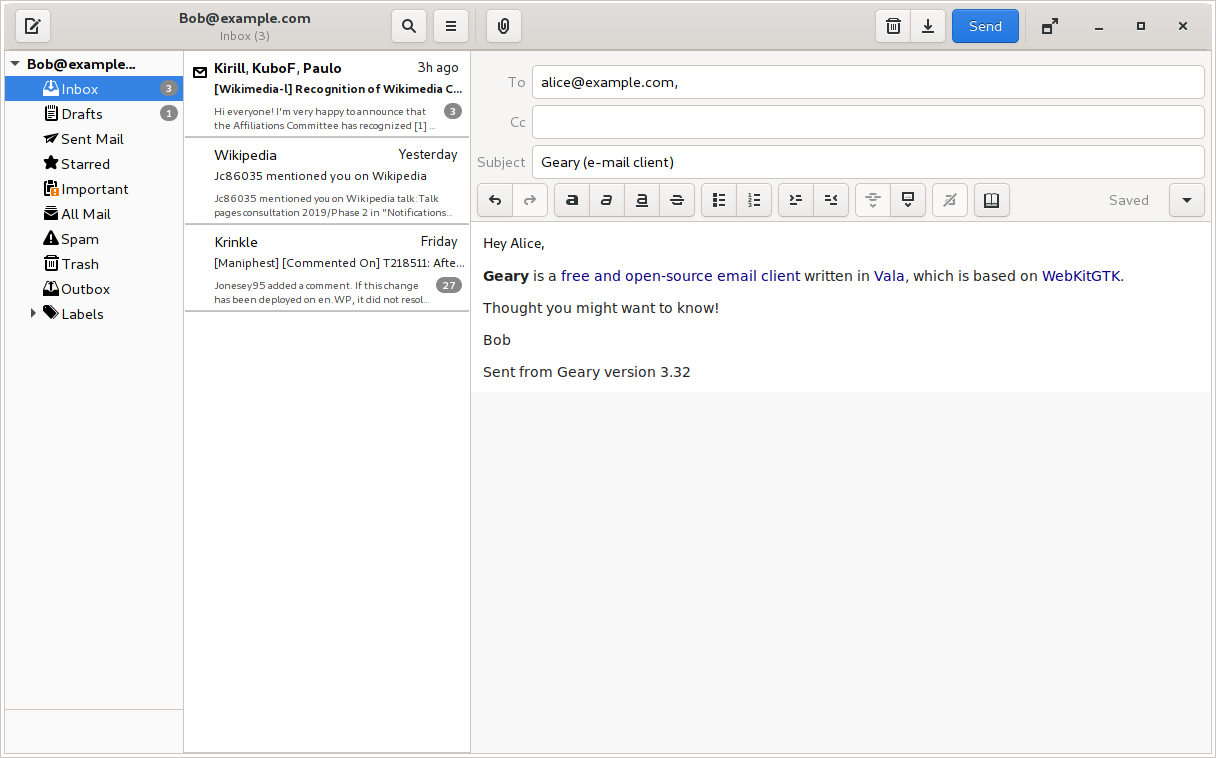
- Geary v3.32 (2019-03)
- Original author: Yorba Foundation
- Developers: The GNOME Project, Elementary
- Initial release: May 4, 2012; 13 years ago
- Stable release: 46.0 / 20 May 2024
- Repository: gitlab.gnome.org/GNOME/geary.git
- Written in: Vala (GTK)
- Operating system: Unix-like
- Type: Email client
- License: LGPL-2.1-or-later
- Website: wiki.gnome.org/Apps/Geary

Geary is a free and open-source email client written in Vala and based on WebKitGTK. Although since adopted by the GNOME project, it originally was developed by the Yorba Foundation. The purpose of this e-mail client, according to Adam Dingle, Yorba founder, was to bring back users from online webmails to a faster and easier to use desktop application.

Pantheon Mail was a fork initiated by the Elementary OS community after the demise of Yorba, though it was later rewritten from scratch so that the only remaining references to Geary in the Pantheon code base are in some translations.

== Features ==
- Supports Gmail, Yahoo! Mail, Outlook.com, and popular IMAP servers.
- Mail organized by conversations.
- Support for sending as another identity.
- Full-featured HTML mail composer.
- Support for reading TNEF attachments.
- Fast keyword search with values like from:john, is:read, is:unread and is:starred.
- Desktop notification of new mails.
- GNOME Keyring integration to store passwords for email accounts.

Implementation to support GPG had been started, but is still incomplete as of 2019.

== Technical information ==
Geary internally uses an SQLite database to store a local copy of emails and for indexing. It uses a fully asynchronous GObject-based IMAP client library. One feature that distinguishes Geary from other open source email clients is its focus on the conversation view. Both Geary and Pantheon Mail are using gettext for translations.

As of April 3, 2016, Pantheon Mail has not been migrated to WebKitGTK+2 yet. The developers decided first to migrate the code managing the conversation view to use native GTK widgets (Gtk.CSS and Granite, a GTK+ library used as part of elementary OS). This offered several advantages, including minimizing the use of webviews, reducing the code, supporting hardware accelerated animations, and supporting RTL languages. They also removed the use of custom GTK bars like PillHeaderBar which were making the code complicated and difficult to read. Geary uses WebKit2 since at least version 3.32.0.

== History ==
Historically, Elementary OS directly supported the project and Geary became the default application in that Linux distribution.

On March 25, 2013, Jim Nelson, executive director at Yorba, launched a crowdfunding campaign on IndieGoGo to gather US$100,000 that would have been used to pay the 3 full-time Yorba engineers that were working at that time on Geary. At the end of the campaign on April 23, 2013, only US$50,860 were gathered from 1,192 backers. The goal was not met and the campaign failed. According to the rules set by IndieGoGo, Yorba did not receive any of the money that had been pledged.

After this failure, Jim Nelson declared in a blog post that the crowdfunding campaign was kind of an experiment to see if that route was enough to sustain open-source development. He reaffirmed Geary had been created to improve the Linux experience, and therefore had no chance of being ported to macOS or Windows platforms.

As the Yorba Foundation had stopped its activities and GNOME had not announced any plans about this project at the time, the future of Geary was unclear. As a result, to these uncertainties, due to previous design disagreements with the old Geary team and because elementary OS was actually using Geary as the default mail client (though in a heavily patched version), Danielle Foré, the leader of Elementary OS, decided to fork the project on November 18, 2015 and continue with the development as a fork. The project was renamed Pantheon Mail during the process. Pantheon Mail replaced Geary in elementary OS 0.4, which is codenamed Loki.

In March 2016, Michael Gratton applied to become the new maintainer of Geary. His main goal was to try fixing pressing issues like the dependency on the old WebKit1GTK, collaboration with Pantheon Mail, better support for non-GMail servers, mailbox management, the account UI, extending search, etc. Contributing to Geary as a GNOME project requires the maintainer to become a GNOME member. After a discussion with Adam Dingle, Yorba's founder, both agreed to wait for Gratton to fulfill GNOME membership application requirements. In the meantime, Gratton will post his patches to the GNOME Bugzilla instance and Adam will commit them for him.

On May 15, 2016, version 0.11 was released,. Version 0.13 was released on February 18, 2019. In March 2019, with version 3.32, the version scheme was changed to match GNOME's release schedule (note the difference in even/odd version numbers).

== Naming ==
The initial name "Geary" coincides with the name of the Geary Street, because all Yorba's products were named after streets in San Francisco. However, according to a former Yorba employee, the application was not named after the address where Yorba Foundation was located. That was actually a coincidence. The first beta of Geary was released in May 2012, and Yorba was still located on Capp Street at the time.
