= Piwigo =

Photo gallery software

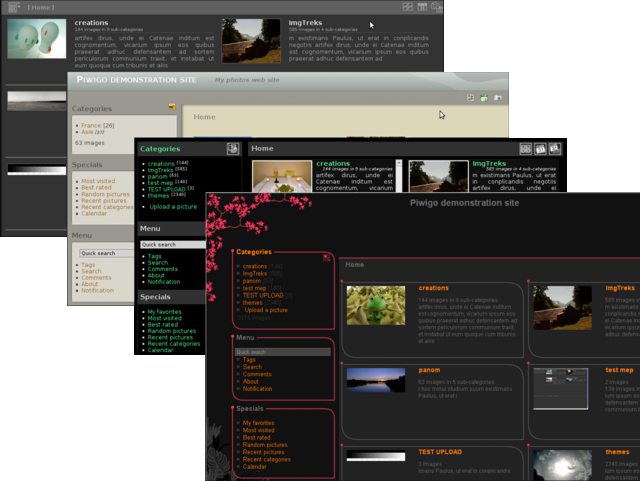
- Piwigo screens
- Developers: Pierrick Le Gall and the Piwigo Team
- Stable release: 16.4.0 / 3 May 2026; 11 days ago
- Written in: PHP
- Available in: Multilingual 85 languages
- Type: Online Gallery
- License: GPL
- Website: piwigo.org
- Repository: github.com/piwigo/piwigo

Piwigo is a free and open-source web-based photo gallery, originally written by Pierrick Le Gall. It is written in PHP and requires a MySQL database.

== Deployment ==
Piwigo can be deployed using various methods in a hosting environment. Users download the current version of Piwigo from Piwigo.org. Either they download the full archive and upload the source code to their hosting environment or they download the NetInstall (a single PHP file), upload it to their hosting environment and let it download the full archive automatically.

Many shared web hosting services also offer automated Piwigo installation through their control panel: for example, Piwigo is available in SimpleScripts and Softaculous.

== History ==
Piwigo (originally named PhpWebGallery) was written by Pierrick Le Gall as a personal project in 2001. Inspired by the opensource web forum phpBB that he installed for his university website, he chose the GNU General Public License to distribute Piwigo and start a community around the project. The first version of Piwigo was released in April 2002.

In 2002, Piwigo became multilingual. In 2004, a bugtracker was installed in order to enable co-operative working as a team. In 2005 an online extension manager made contributions easier to share. In 2006, themes made customization possible. In 2007 plugins were introduced to extend Piwigo features. In 2009 PhpWebGallery was renamed Piwigo and pLoader (Piwigo Uploader) made photo uploading easier for Windows, Mac and Linux users. In 2010, digiKam, Shotwell, Lightroom made it possible to upload photos to any Piwigo gallery, an enhanced web uploader was provided in Piwigo 2.1 and Piwigo.com was launched (dedicated hosting for Piwigo). As of 2013, there were 10 members in the Piwigo team, 100 translators, a website available in 12 languages and a thriving community.
