= Yorba Foundation =

Non-profit organization

- Founded: February 17, 2009; 17 years ago
- Founder: Adam Dingle
- Dissolved: October 25, 2015; 11 years ago
- Type: Community
- Purpose: Office software
- Location: San Francisco, United States
- Products: Shotwell, Geary
- Staff: 5
- Website: www.yorba.org twitter.com/yorba_org (Twitter)

Yorba Foundation was a non-profit software group based in San Francisco, and founded by Adam Dingle wanting to bring first class software to the open source community. This organization had been created to answer people thinking open source brings hard to use, clunky and low-quality software usable only by hackers.

The company was made of 5 employees: Jim Nelson (coder and executive director), Adam Dingle (founder), Charles Lindsay, Eric Gregory and Nate Lillich (software engineers).

== History ==
In December 2009, Yorba Foundation applied to get the 501(c)(3) status. After some requests for clarification by IRS on June 23, 2010, and September 14, 2010. On May 22, 2014, Yorba's nonprofit status was denied. The IRS explained that the organization makes software that can be used by any person for any purpose, and not just for a specific community. Therefore, Yorba cannot be considered as a charity even though the Apache Foundation, with exactly the same purpose, was considered a nonprofit. Although this status would have helped, according to Jim Nelson, Yorba's existence didn't hinge on it.

On October 31, 2013, Yorba moved from San Francisco's Mission District to its Financial District.

By the end of April 2015, the last Yorba employee, Jim Nelson, left the foundation. The stated reason for the closure is lack of financially sustainability: funding ran out, and donations did not match expenses. Even if Yorba had received the 501(c)(3) status allowing it to be tax exempt, it's not likely to have helped much.

On October 25, 2015, the following message was posted on their webpage without any further explanation:

Yorba was a non-profit free software group based in San Francisco that was active from 2009 until early 2015

May 2016 marked the beginning of the formal dissolution of the organization with the complete dissolution happening later that year.

In May 2016, Yorba reassigned the copyright of all their software to the Software Freedom Conservancy except for their California calendar application which will be assigned in the near future due to an oversight on Yorba's part.

== Main developments ==
=== Shotwell ===
Shotwell is an image manager for the GNOME 3 desktop, which features:

- Importing from local storage or a camera.
- Uploading images to photo sharing services, such as Flickr and Tumblr.
- Organization by time, keywords, or folders.
