= Comparison of graphics file formats =

This is a comparison of image file formats (graphics file formats). This comparison primarily features file formats for 2D images.

== General ==
Ownership of the format and related information.

| Format | Full name | Owner | based Format | File extension | MIME type | Application | Patent- free |
|---|---|---|---|---|---|---|---|
| AI | Adobe Illustrator Document | Adobe Systems | | .ai | application/illustrator, application/postscript | Adobe Illustrator | No |
| ANI | ANI file format | Microsoft | RIFF | .ani | | Microsoft Windows | |
| ANIM | | Electronic Arts and Commodore | IFF | .iff, .anim | video/x-anim | | |
| APNG | Animated Portable Network Graphics | Mozilla | PNG | .png | image/png | Gecko 1.9 and Opera | Yes |
| Apple Icon Image | | Apple Inc. | | .icns | | macOS | |
| ART | | AOL | | .art | | | |
| ASCII art | | | | .txt, .ansi, .text | text/vnd.ascii-art | Supported by GIMP | |
| AutoCAD DXF | Drawing Interchange Format | Autodesk | | .dxf | image/vnd.dxf | | |
| ARW | Sony Alpha RAW | Sony | TIFF | .arw | | | |
| AVIF | AV1 Image File Format | Alliance for Open Media (AOMedia) | AV1 | .avif | image/avif | General purpose | royalty-free |
| BAY | Casio RAW | Casio | | .bay | | | |
| BMP | raw-data unencoded or encoded bitmap | simple colour image format, far older than Microsoft; some .bmp encoding formats developed/owned by Microsoft | | .bmp, .dib, .rle,.2bp (2bpp) | image/x-bmp | Used by many 2D applications. | Yes |
| BPG | Better Portable Graphics | Fabrice Bellard | HEVC | .bpg | | General purpose | No |
| BSAVE | BSAVE Image | | | .BSV | | Used by IBM PC. | |
| CAL | CALS raster file format | | | .cal, .cals, .ras, .dcl | | | |
| CIFF | Camera Image File Format | Canon | | .crw, .ciff | | | |
| CR2 | Canon RAW 2 | Canon | TIFF | .cr2 | | | |
| CDR | CorelDRAW Document | Corel Corporation | | .cdr, .ccx, .cdt, .cmx | application/coreldraw | CorelDRAW | No |
| CD5 | Chasys Draw IES Image | John Paul Chacha | | .cd5 | | Native format for Chasys Draw IES for storing layered images and animations | No |
| CGM | Computer Graphics Metafile | | | .cgm | image/cgm | CGM files are editable using programs that support the format, such as IBM Lotus Freelance Graphics, Inkscape, etc. | |
| CIN | Cineon | | | .cin | image/cineon | | |
| CPC | Cartesian Perceptual Compression | Cartesian Products, Inc. | | .cpc, .cpi | image/cpi | Highly compressed raster imaging format. | No |
| DCS | Kodak DCS Pro RAW | Kodak | | .dcs | | | |
| DCR | Digital Camera Raw | Kodak | TIFF | .dcr | | | |
| DDS | DirectDraw Surface | Microsoft | | .dds | | | |
| DNG | Digital Negative | Adobe Systems | compatible with ISO 12234-2, TIFF/EP | .dng | | A raw image format suitable as an archival format and as the native raw format of digital cameras | Yes |
| DICOM | Digital Imaging and Communications in Medicine | National Electrical Manufacturers Association | | .dcm, .dicom | application/dicom | Numerous biomedical imaging applications (e.g. OsiriX, XMedCon), some general bitmap graphics applications (e.g. GIMP, Photoshop) | |
| DjVu | DjVu | AT&T Research | | .djvu, .djv | image/vnd.djvu | | |
| DPX | Digital Picture eXchange file format | | | .dpx | image/dpx | | |
| DRF | Kodak Pro Back RAW | Kodak | | .drf | | | |
| Encapsulated PostScript | page description/scripting language (see PostScript) | Adobe | | .epi, .eps, .eps2,.eps3, .epsf, .epsi,.ept | application/postscript | printing/publishing industry standard format | |
| ECW | Enhanced Compressed Wavelet | ERDAS | | .ecw | | Wavelet image format used primarily with geo-referenced aerial and satellite imagery | No |
| EMF | Enhanced Metafile Format | Microsoft | | .emf, .emz | | Microsoft Office | |
| EMF+ | Enhanced Metafile Format Plus Extensions | Microsoft | | .emf, .emz | | | |
| ERF | EPSON RAW | EPSON | TIFF | .erf | | | |
| Exif | Exchangeable Image File Format | | | .exif | | | |
| EVA | Extended Vector Animation | Sharp Corporation | | .eva | application/x-eva | | |
| EXR | OpenEXR | ILM | | .exr | image/exr | Used in film effects for 3d rendering and hdr images. | Yes |
| FITS | Flexible Image Transport System | | | .fit, .fits | | Scientific (esp. astronomical) data acquisition | |
| FLIC | | Autodesk | | .fli, .flc, .flx, .flh, .flt | | Supported by GIMP | |
| FLIF | Free Lossless Image Format | | | .flif, .flf | | General-purpose, superseded by Jpeg XL | Yes |
| FPX | FlashPix (1.0.2) | | | .fpx | image/vnd.fpx | | |
| Gerber Format | The Gerber Format Specification | Ucamco | Printable ASCII | .gbr | application/vnd.gerber | Printed Circuit Board or PCB software | Yes |
| GIF | Graphics Interchange Format | CompuServe, Unisys (compression algorithm) | | .gif, .gfa, .giff | image/gif | General purpose, popular for small animated images | Yes |
| HEIF | High Efficiency Image Format | Motion Pictures Expert Group (MPEG) | | .heif, .heic | image/heif, image/heic, image/heic-sequence, image/heif-sequence | General purpose | No |
| HDRi | | | TIFF | .tif, .tiff | image/tiff | | |
| ICER | | NASA Mars Rovers | | | | | |
| ICO | ICO file format | Microsoft | | .ico, .cur | image/vnd.Microsoft.icon, image/x-icon | Microsoft Windows and web browsers as favicon | |
| ICS | Image Cytometry Standard | | | .ics, .ids | | | |
| IGES | Initial Graphics Exchange Specification | | | .igs | image/iges | CAD/CAM interoperability | Yes |
| ILBM | InterLeaved BitMap | Electronic Arts and Commodore | IFF | .iff, .ilbm, .lbm | image/x-ilbm | Planar graphics format designed for Amiga graphics hardware. | Yes |
| JBIG | | Joint Bi-level Image Experts Group | | .jbig, .bie, .jbg | | | |
| JBIG2 | | Joint Bi-level Image Experts Group | | | | | |
| JNG | JPEG Network Graphics | | | .jng | image/x-jng | | Yes |
| JPEG | Joint Photographic Experts Group | Joint Photographic Experts Group | | .jpg, .jpeg, .jpe (containers:.jif, .jfif, .jfi) | image/jpeg | General purpose | Yes |
| JPEG 2000 | Joint Photographic Experts Group 2000 | Joint Photographic Experts Group | | .jp2, .j2c, .jpc,.j2k, .jpx | image/jp2 | General purpose | royalty-free |
| JPEG-LS | | Joint Photographic Experts Group | | .jls | | | |
| JPEG-HDR | | Dolby Laboratories/BrightSide Technologies | JPEG | | | General purpose | |
| JPEG XL | | Joint Photographic Experts Group | PIK, FUIF (FLIF) | .jxl | image/jxl | General-purpose, lossless JPEG transcoding. | Yes |
| JPEG XT | | Joint Photographic Experts Group | | | | General purpose | |
| JPEG XR / HD Photo | JPEG XR / HD Photo | Microsoft | | .wdp, .hdp, .jxr | image/vnd.ms-photo | General purpose | royalty-free |
| KDC | Kodak DC40/DC50 RAW | Kodak | TIFF | .kdc | | | |
| K25 | Kodak DC25 RAW | Kodak | TIFF | .k25 | | | |
| Logluv TIFF | | Greg Ward | TIFF | | | Supported by LibTIFF | |
| MNG | Multiple-image Network Graphics | | PNG | .mng | video/x-mng | | Yes |
| NEF | Nikon RAW | Nikon | TIFF | .nef | | | |
| MIFF | Magick image file format | ImageMagick Studio | | .miff | | ImageMagick | |
| MRW | Minolta RAW | Minolta | | .mrw | | | |
| ORF | Olympus RAW | Olympus | TIFF | .orf | | | |
| PAM | portable arbitrary map file format | | | .pam | image/x-portable-arbitrarymap | | Yes |
| PBM | Portable Bitmap File Format | | ASCII | .pbm | image/x-portable-bitmap | | Yes |
| PCX | ZSoft PC Paintbrush File | ZSoft Corporation | | .pcx, .pcc, .dcx | image/x-pcx | Dated rle packed indexed image format, used in some early 3d shooting games like Unreal Tournament as it takes up very little space and is easy to decode. | ? |
| PDF | Portable Document Format | Adobe Systems | | .pdf, .epdf | application/pdf | | |
| PEF | PENTAX RAW | PENTAX | TIFF | .pef | | | |
| PGF | Progressive Graphics File | xeraina GmbH | | .pgf | | Photographic images, eventual replacement for JPEG. | Yes |
| PGM | Portable Graymap File Format | | ASCII | .pgm | image/x-portable-graymap | | Yes |
| PGML | Precision Graphics Markup Language | Adobe Systems, IBM, Netscape, Sun Microsystems | | | | | Yes |
| PICT | Macintosh PICT Format | Apple Inc. | | .pict, .pic, .pct,.pct1, .pct2 | image/pict | Metafile for Classic Mac OS, not meant for print publishing. | Likely expired |
| PICtor | | John Bridges, Doug Wolfgram | | .pic | | Supported by PCPaint | |
| PNG | Portable Network Graphics | World Wide Web Consortium | | .png | image/png | General purpose | Yes |
| PNM | Portable Anymap File Format | | ASCII | .pnm | image/x-portable-anymap | | Yes |
| PostScript | page description/scripting language, levels 1–3 | Adobe | | .ps, .ps2, .ps3 | | printing/publishing industry standard format | |
| PPM | Portable Pixmap File Format | | ASCII | .ppm | image/x-portable-pixmap | Very easy to understand. Programs to analyze and write to this format are easily written. | Yes |
| PSD | Photoshop Document | Adobe Systems | | .psd, .psb, .pdb,.pdd | image/vnd.adobe.photoshop | Used mainly for storing image manipulation & editing data. | No |
| PSP | Paint Shop Pro Document | Corel Corporation | | .psp, .tub,.pspimage | image/x-psp | Paint Shop Pro | ? |
| QOI | Quite OK Image Format | Dominic Szablewski | | .qoi | | | Yes |
| RAD | | Gregory Ward Larson | | .rad | | Radiance | |
| RAF | Fujifilm RAW | Fujifilm | | .raf | | | |
| RGBE | | Gregory Ward Larson | | .hdr | image/vnd.radiance | Radiance, most HDR imaging software | |
| SGI | Silicon Graphics Image | | | .sgi, .rgb, .rgba,.bw, .int, .inta,.icon | | | |
| SRF | Sony RAW File | Sony | TIFF | .srf, .sr2 | | | |
| SVG | Scalable Vector Graphics | World Wide Web Consortium | XML | .svg,.svgz (compressed) | image/svg+xml | Vector graphics | Yes |
| SWF | Shockwave Flash | Adobe Systems | | .swf | application/x-shockwave-flash | Adobe Flash Player | |
| TGA | Truevision Targa | Truevision Inc. | | .tga, .tpic | image/tga | Texture format used by many 3d application. | Yes |
| TIFF | Tag Image File Format | Adobe Systems | | .tiff, .tif | image/tiff | Document scanning and imaging format, also functions as a container. | Yes |
| TIFF/EP | Tag Image File Format / Electronic Photography | International Organization for Standardization | TIFF | .tiff, .tif | | | |
| UFO | Ulead File for Objects | | | .ufo | | | |
| VML | Vector Markup Language | Microsoft | XML | .htm, .html | application/vnd.openxmlformats-officedocument.vmlDrawing | Internet Explorer, Microsoft Office | Yes |
| WBMP | Wireless Application Protocol Bitmap Format | Open Mobile Alliance (formerly WAP Forum) | | .wbmp, .wbm, .wbp | image/vnd.wap.wbmp | Used in WAP-pages | Yes |
| WebP | WebP image format | Google | | .webp | image/webp | General purpose | royalty-free |
| WMF | Windows Metafile Format | Microsoft | | .wmf, .wmz | | | |
| XAR | Xar | Xara | Xar (graphics) | .xar | application/vnd.xara | Xara Photo & Graphic Designer | Yes |
| XBM | X BitMap, colour variant of original black-and-white bitmap (bmp) format | | | .xbm, .bm,.icon, .bitmap | image/x-xbitmap | Used by many legacy Unix applications. | |
| XCF | XCF, name derived from eXperimental Computing Facility | The GIMP Team | | .xcf,.xcfbz2 (compressed),.xcfgz (compressed) | application/x-gimp-image | GIMP | |
| XPM | X-Pixmap | | | .xpm, .pm | image/x-xpm | Legacy Unix applications | |
| X3F | SIGMA RAW | SIGMA | | .x3f | | | |
| Format | Full name | Owner | based Format | File extension | MIME type | Application | Patent- free |

== Technical details ==
| Format | Compression algorithm | Raster/ vector | Maximum Color depth | Indexed color | Transparency | Metadata | Interlacing | Multi-page | Animation | Layers | Color management | Extendable | HDR format | CMYK |
|---|---|---|---|---|---|---|---|---|---|---|---|---|---|---|
| AI | Lossy and lossless | Both | 8 bpc | Yes | Yes | Yes | No | Yes | No | Yes | Yes | —N/a | No | |
| AVIF | Lossy and lossless (AV1) | Raster | 12 bpc | No | Yes | Yes | No | No | Yes | No | Yes | Yes | Yes | No |
| BMP | None, lossy (JPEG), and lossless (RLE, PNG) | Raster | 16 bpc | Yes | Yes | No | No | No | No | No | Yes | No | No | No |
| BPG | Lossy and lossless (HEVC) | Raster | 14 bpc | No | Yes | Yes | No | No | Yes | —N/a | Yes | —N/a | —N/a | |
| CD5 | Lossless (ACSC) | Both | 16 bpc | Yes | Yes | Yes | No | Yes | Yes | Yes | Partial | Yes | No | |
| CDR | Lossy and lossless | Both | 8 bpc | Yes | Yes | Yes | No | Yes | No | Yes | Yes | —N/a | No | |
| CPC | Lossy (CPC) | Raster | 1 | No | No | Yes | No | Yes | No | No | No | Yes, via embedded dictionary | No | |
| EPS | None and lossless (LZW, Deflate, RLE, DCT) | Both | Device specific | No | Yes | Yes | —N/a | Yes | No | Yes | Yes | Yes | Yes | |
| EXR | None and lossless (RLE, ZIP, Piz, PXR24, and B44, B44A, DWAA, DWAB) | Raster | 32 bpc | No | Yes | Yes | No | Yes | No | Yes | Yes | Yes | Yes | |
| FLIF | Lossless (MANIAC entropy coding) | Raster | 16 bpc | Yes | Yes | Yes | Yes | No | Yes | No | Yes | Yes, via chunks | Yes | |
| GIF | Lossless (LZW) | Raster | 255 colors | Yes | Yes | Yes | Yes | Yes | Yes | Yes | No | Yes (GIF89a) | No | No |
| HD Photo / JPEG XR | Lossy and lossless (bi-orthogonal transform) | Raster | 32 bpc | No | Yes | Yes | Yes | Yes | No | No | Yes | Yes | Yes | |
| ILBM | None and lossless (RLE) | Raster | 8 bpc | Yes | No | Yes | Yes | No | Yes, Palette-shifting | No | No | Yes | No | |
| JPEG | Lossy (DCT, RLE, and Huffman predictive nearest neighbor) | Raster | 8 bpc | No | No | Yes | Yes | No | No | No | Yes | No | No (see unofficial JPEG-HDR) | Yes |
| JPEG 2000 | Lossy and lossless (DWT) | Raster | 38 bpc | No | Yes | Yes | Yes | No | No | No | Yes | —N/a | No | Yes |
| JPEG XL | Lossy and lossless (VarDCT mode, Modular mode) | Raster | 32 bpc | Yes | Yes | Yes | Yes | Yes | Yes | Yes | Yes | Yes | Yes | Yes |
| KRA | None | Both | 32 bpc | No | Yes | Yes | No | Yes | Yes | Yes | Yes | Yes | Yes | |
| ORA | Lossless | Both | 16 bpc | Yes | Yes | Yes | Yes | Yes | No | Yes | Yes | Yes | Yes | |
| PAM | None | Raster | Up to 16 | No | Yes | Yes | No | Yes | No | No | No | Yes | No | |
| PCX | None and lossless (RLE) | Raster | 8 bpc | Yes | Yes | No | No | Yes | No | No | No | No | No | |
| PGF | Lossy and lossless (DWT) | Raster | 16 bpc | Yes | Yes | Yes | Yes | No | No | No | No | —N/a | No | |
| PICT | None, lossy (Quicktime), and lossless (RLE) | Both | 8 bpc | Yes | Yes | Yes | —N/a | No | No | No | —N/a | No? | No | |
| PNG | Lossless (Deflate) | Raster | 16 bpc | Yes | Yes | Yes | Yes | No | Yes (since the third edition) | No | Yes | Yes, via chunks | Yes | No |
| PPM | None | Raster | 8 ppc | No | No | Yes | No | Yes | No | No | No | No | No | |
| PSD and PSB | None and lossless (RLE) | Both | 32 bpc | Yes | Yes | Yes | —N/a | No | Yes | Yes | Yes | No? | Yes | |
| PSP | None | Both | 16 bpc | Yes | Yes | Yes | No | —N/a | No | Yes | —N/a | —N/a | No | |
| SVG | None and lossless (gzip) | Vector (Note: Supports raster data embedding with the use of Base64.) | 8 bpc | No | Yes | Yes | —N/a | Yes (1.2 draft) | Yes (SMIL/SVG) | Yes | Yes | Yes, XML based | —N/a | |
| TGA | None, lossless (RLE), and other | Raster | 32 bpc | Yes | Yes | Yes | No | No | No | No | No | —N/a | No | |
| TIFF | None, lossless (LZW, RLE, ZIP), and other | Both | 16 bpc | Yes | Yes | Yes | Yes | Yes | No | Yes | Yes | Yes, via tags | Yes, TIFF float | Yes |
| WebP | Lossy and lossless | Raster | 8 bpc | No | Yes | Yes | No | Yes | Yes | No | Yes | Yes | No | No |
| XCF | None and lossless (gzip, bzip2 and xz) | Both | 32 bpc | Yes | Yes | Yes | No | No | Yes | Yes | Yes | Yes | Yes | |
| Format | Compression algorithm | Raster/ vector | Maximum Color depth | Indexed color | Trans-parency | Meta- data | Inter- lacing | Multi-page | Anima-tion | Layers | Color manage-ment | Extend- able | HDR format | CMYK |

== See also ==
- List of codecs
