= ICS =

ICS may refer to:

== Computing ==
- Image Cytometry Standard, a digital multidimensional image file format used in life sciences microscopy
- Industrial control system, computer systems and networks used to control industrial plants and infrastructures
- Information and computer science, the combined field of informatics and computing
- Internet chess server, an external server that provides the facility to play, discuss, and view chess over the Internet
- Internet Connection Sharing, a feature in Microsoft operating systems since the advent of Windows 98 Second Edition
- .ics, a filename extension for iCalendar files
- Android Ice Cream Sandwich, the codename for version 4.0 of the Android operating system

== Education ==
- Donald Bren School of Information and Computer Sciences, Irvine, California, United States
- Graduate School of International Corporate Strategy, Tokyo, Japan
- Indian Central School, Singapore
- Institute for Christian Studies, Toronto, Ontario
- Institute of Classical Studies, University of London, UK
- Institute of Cornish Studies, in Falmouth, UK
- Inter-Community School Zürich, Switzerland
- Intermountain Christian School, Utah, United States
- International Christian School (Hong Kong)
- International Community School (Kirkland, Washington)
- International Community School (Singapore)
- International Community School (Thailand)
- International Community School (UK)
- International Community School of Addis Ababa
- International Correspondence Schools
- Islesboro Central School
- Intermediate in Computer Science, a course for the completion of the Higher Secondary School Certificate in Pakistan

== Entertainment ==
- International Channel Shanghai, a foreign-language cable channel
- Immigration And Customs Security, a fictional organization in the Canadian TV series The Border

=== Music ===
- ICS Vortex, alias of Simen Hestnæs, Norwegian rock musician
- Immersion Composition Society, a network of composers, based in the USA

== Medicine ==
- Inhaled corticosteroid, steroid hormones used to treat the nasal mucosa, sinuses, bronchi, and lungs
- Intercostal space, the space between two ribs

== Organizations ==
- ICS Africa
- Imperial Civil Service
- Indian Civil Service
- Indian National Congress (Socialist)
- Institute of Chartered Shipbrokers
- Institute for Computational Sustainability, a Cornell-based institute in the United States
- International Chamber of Shipping
- International Citizen Service, a UK volunteer organization
- International Commission on Stratigraphy, the largest scientific body within the International Union of Geological Sciences
- International Communist Seminar
- International Continence Society, a multidisciplinary membership society for medical professionals concerned with incontinence
- Irish Computer Society, the national body for Information and Communication Technology (ICT) Professionals in Ireland
- Integrated care system, a component of the National Health Service (England)
- Ethiopian Immigration and Citizenship Service, an Ethiopian government agency for immigration and passport related service

== Technology ==
- Ganz CSMG, also known as Ganz ICS, a Hungarian tram type
- In Channel Select, a technology improving programme reception in FM tuners
- International Classification for Standards, an international classification system for technical standards
- International Code of Signals, a maritime signaling standard also abbreviated INTERCO

== Other uses ==
- International Convention on Salvage, a 1989 treaty of International Maritime Organization governing marine salvage
- Incident Command System, an emergency response management system
- InterCity Slovenia, a premium train service in Slovenia
- Israeli Cassini Soldner, a historical geographic coordinate system
- Investor court system
- Inmate Calling Service, a type of specialized telephone service provisioned for use by inmates at correctional facilities
- Iconsiam, a mixed-use development in Thailand

== See also ==
- Ic (disambiguation)
