= Xar =

Xar or XAR may refer to:

- Xar (graphics), a file format used with vector graphics
- XAR, a file archiver and its associated file format
- Michael Portnoy, who uses the stage name XAR
- The ICAO Code for defunct indonesian airline Xpress Air
