= Skylight =

Roof structure allowing daylight

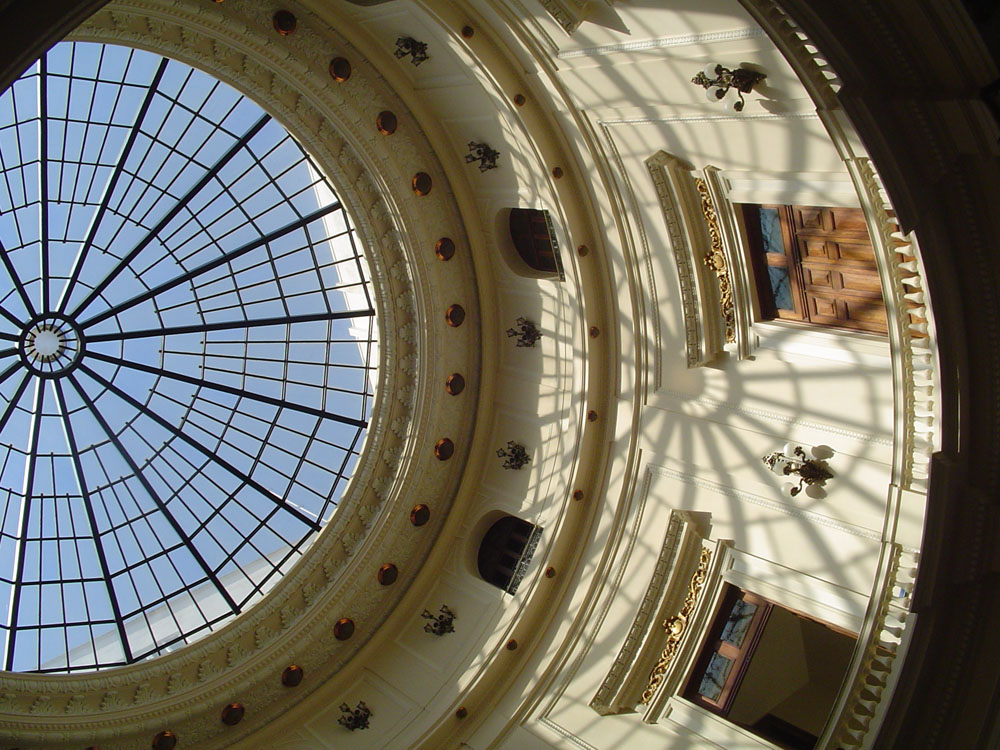
Skylight in the rotunda of Centro Cultural Banco do Brasil in Rio de Janeiro

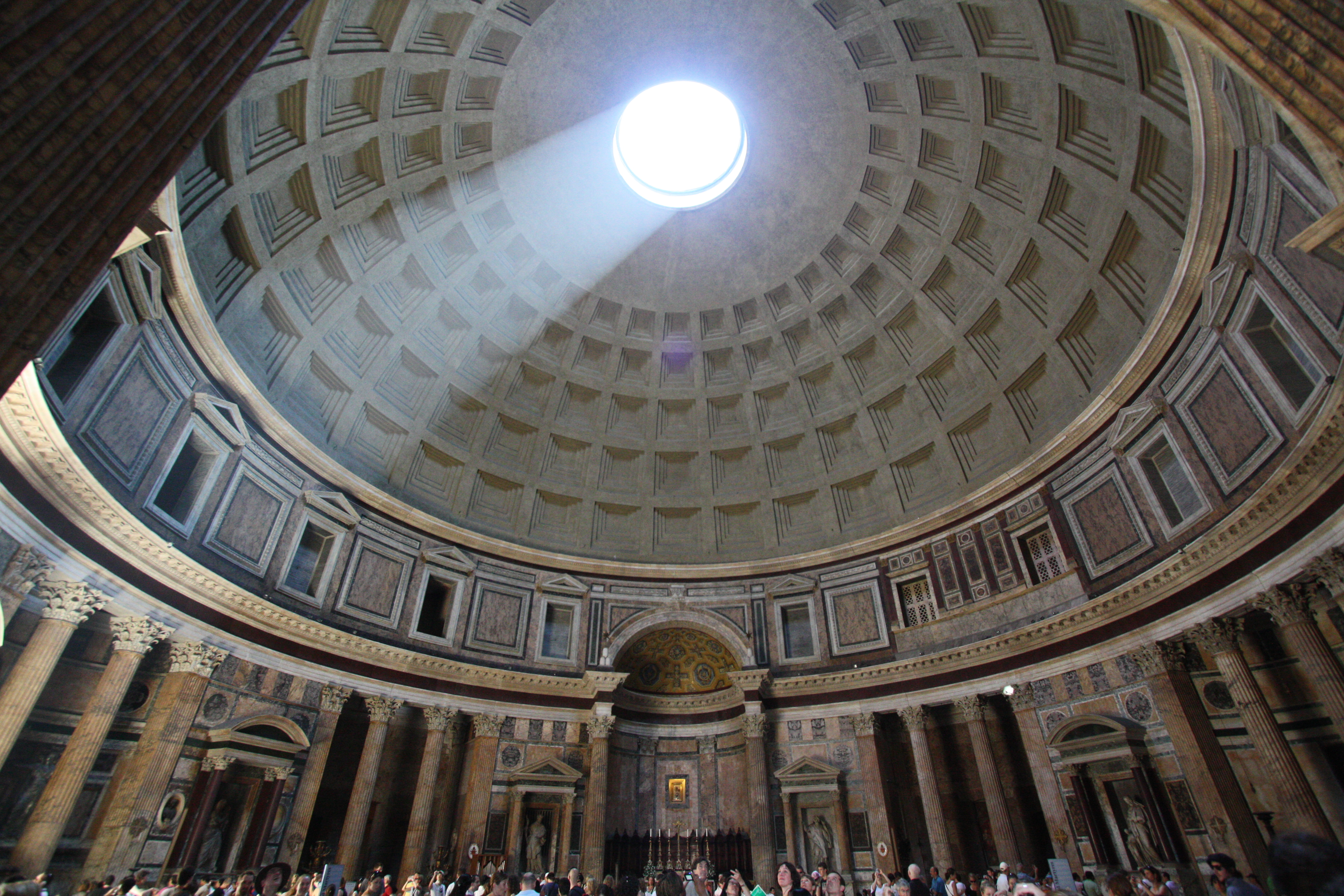
Oculus of the Pantheon, Rome, an open skylight

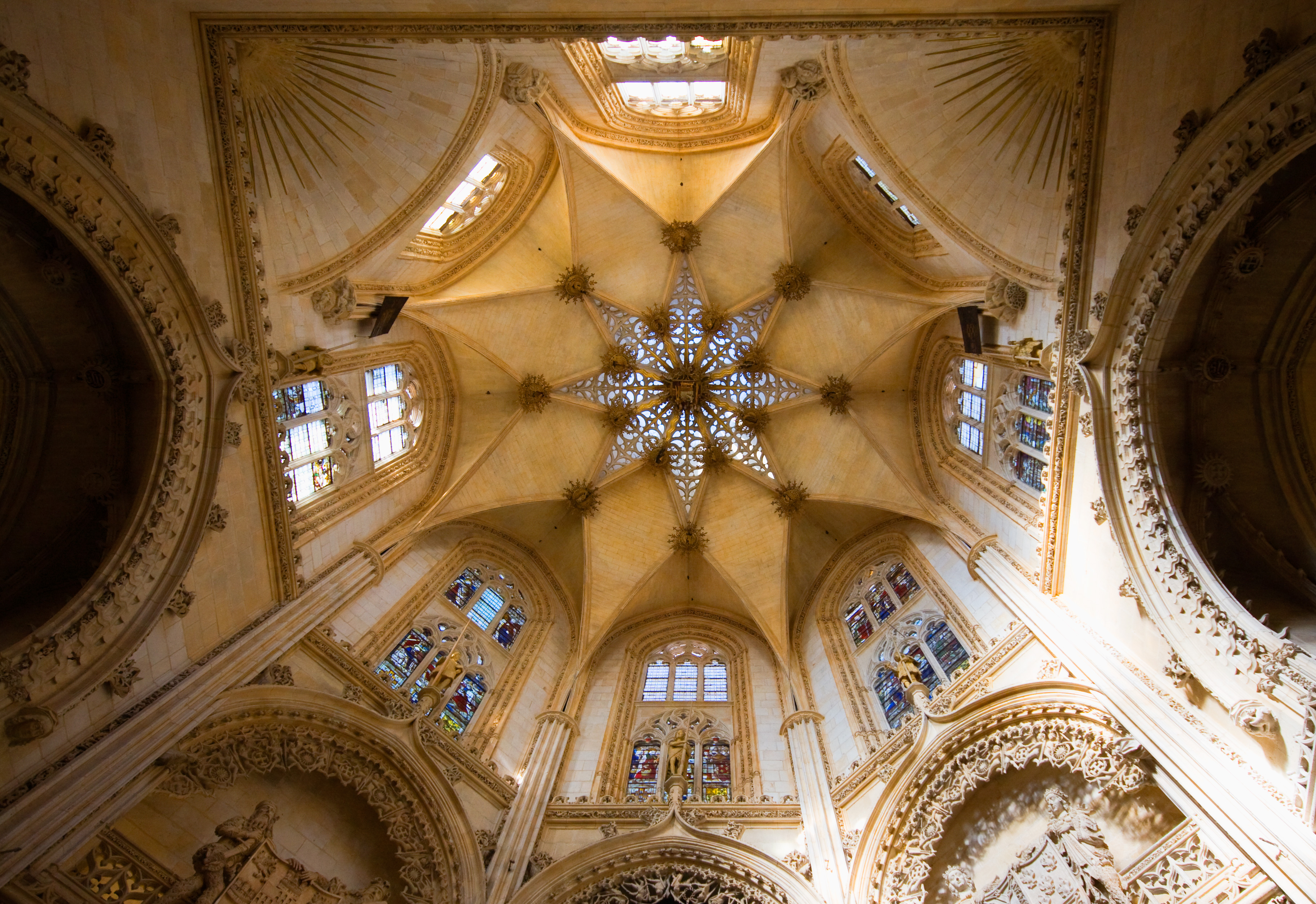
Skylight in the vault in the Chapel of the Constable of the Burgos Cathedral, a glazed closed skylight from the 15th century

A skylight (sometimes called a rooflight) is a light-permitting structure or window, usually made of glass or translucent plastic, that forms all or part of the roof space of a building for daylighting.

== History ==
Open skylights were used in Ancient Roman architecture, such as the oculus of the Pantheon. Glazed "closed" skylights have been in use since the Industrial Revolution, when advances in glass manufacturing made them practical. Since the mid-20th century, advancements in durable translucent plastic material such as ETFE have brought them to many more uses and contexts. Energy conservation has brought new motivation for design innovations and efficiency ratings.

== Description ==
Skylighting types include roof windows, unit skylights, tubular daylighting devices (TDDs), sloped glazing, and custom skylights. Uses include:

- daylighting elements used to allow direct and/or indirect sunlight, via toplighting.
- providing a visual connection to the outdoor environment to interior occupants.
- sustainable building—passive solar heating, and with operable units; ventilation for passive cooling and fresh air exchange.

=== Types ===
==== Open skylight ====
An unglazed hole in a roof.

==== Fixed unit skylight ====
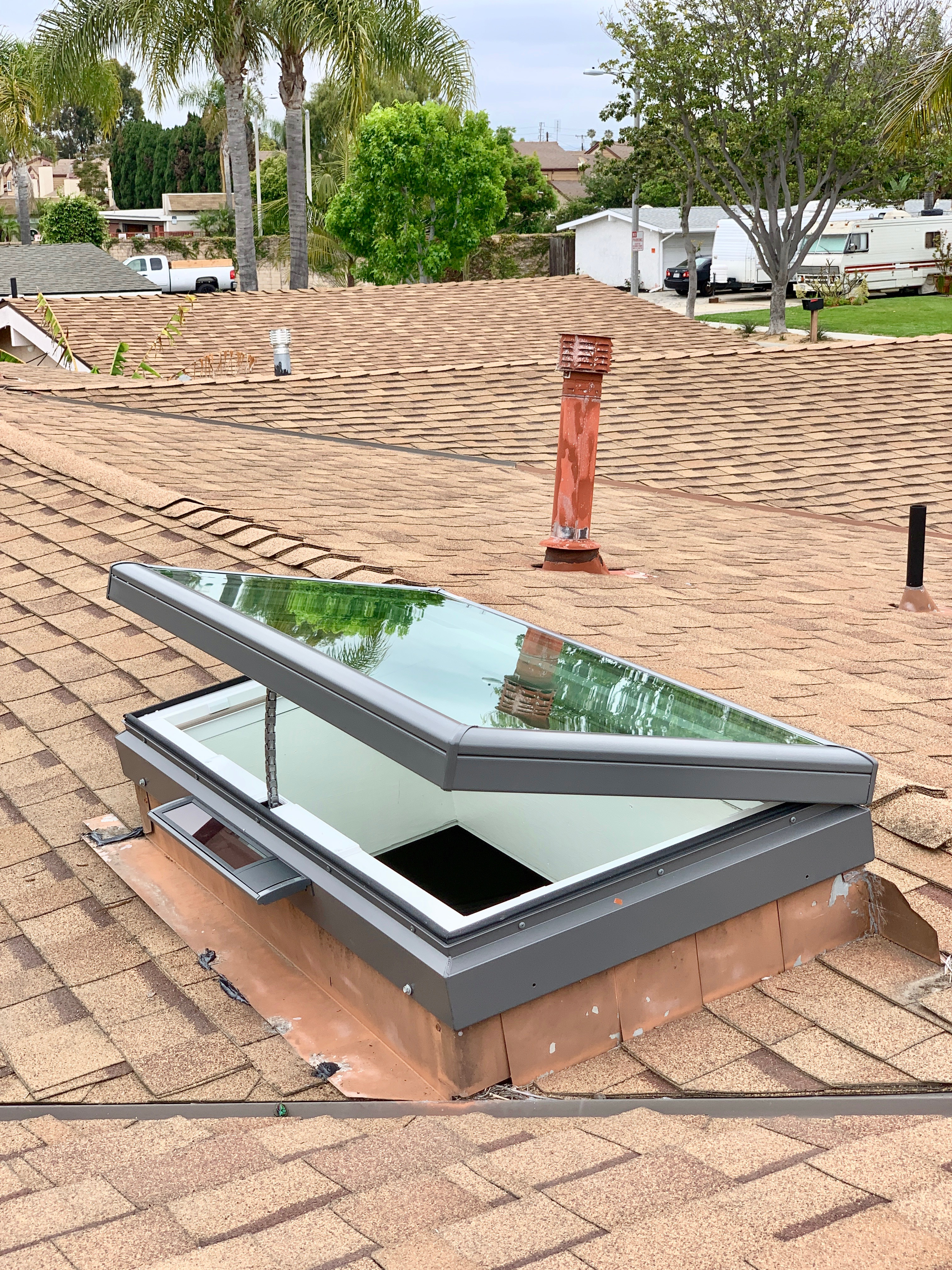
Solar-powered venting skylight in Southern California

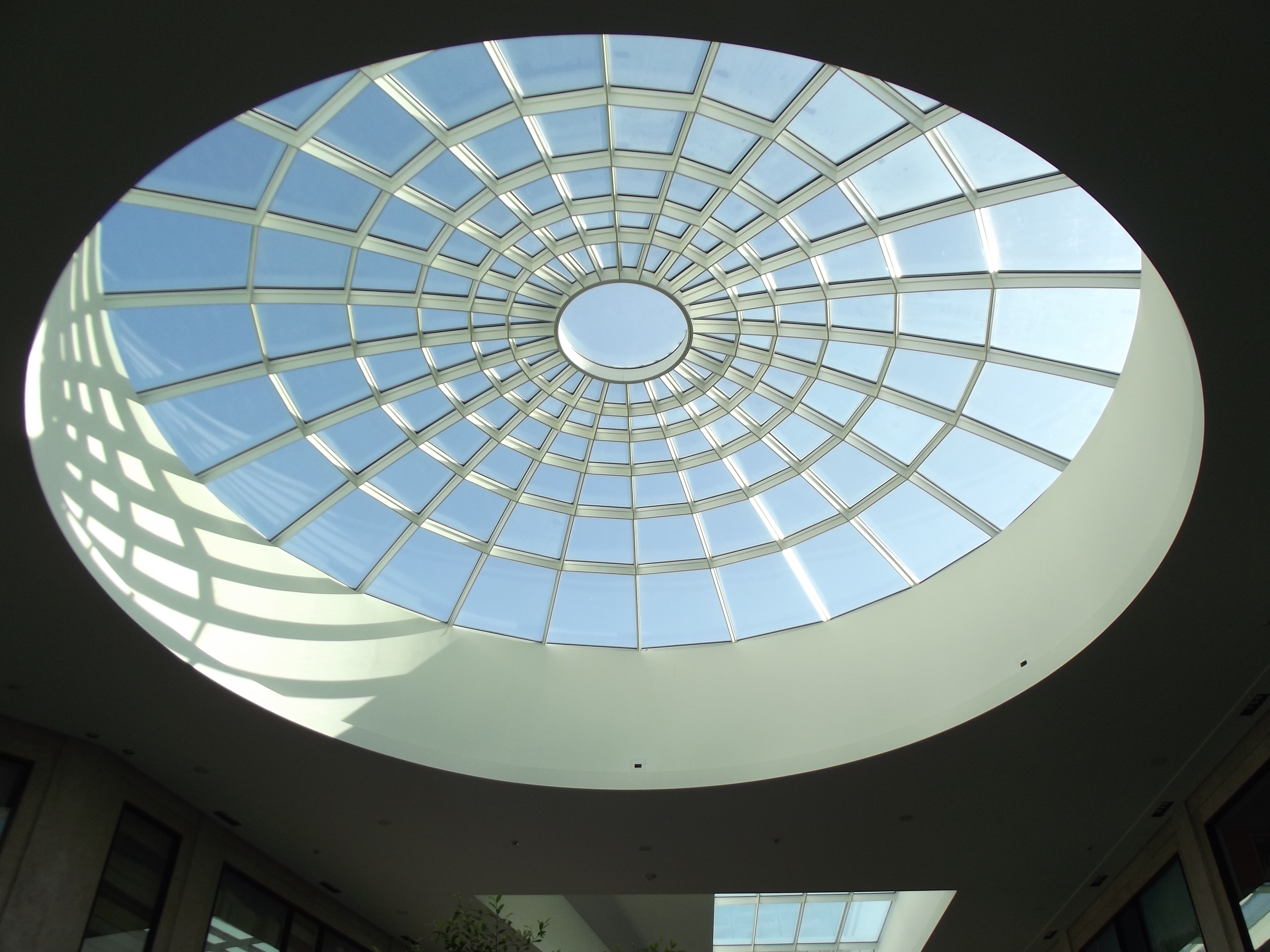
The skylight of Münster's shopping mall

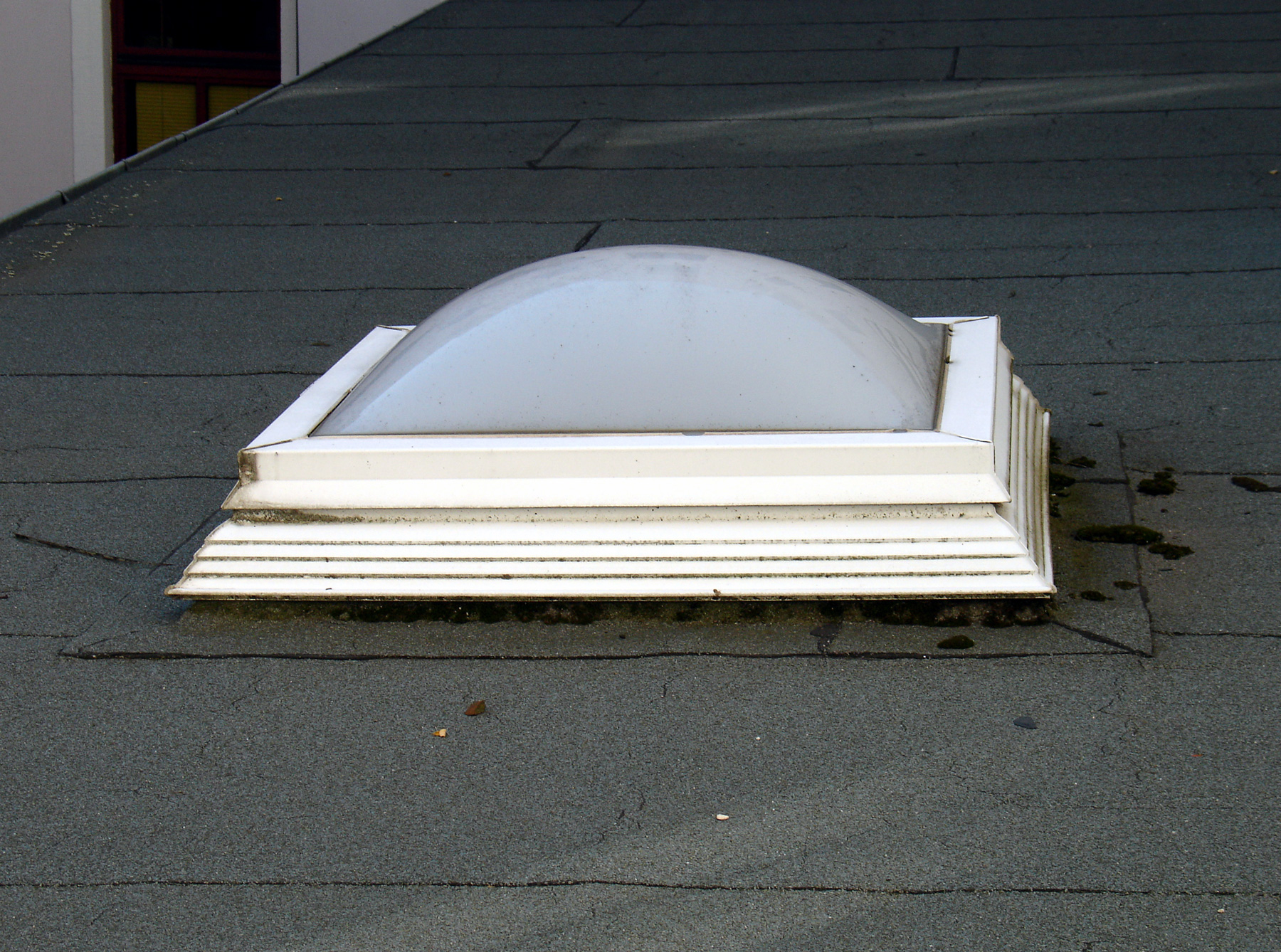
Fixed unit skylight, roof view

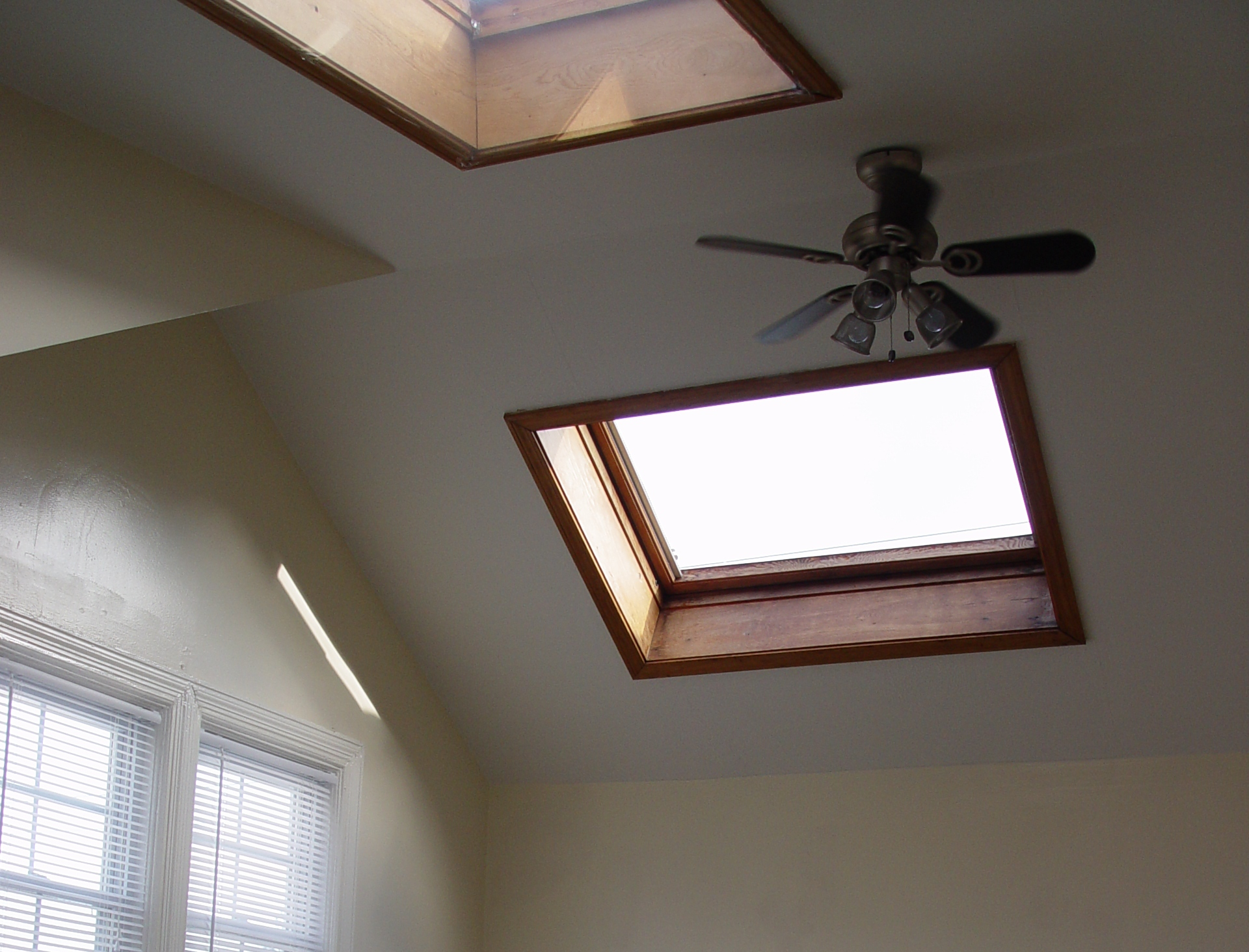
Fixed unit skylights, interior view

A fixed skylight consists of a structural perimeter frame supporting glazing infill (the light-transmitting portion, which is made primarily of glass or plastic). A fixed skylight is non-operable, meaning there is no ventilation.

==== Operable skylight ====
An operable (venting) unit skylight uses a hinged sash attached to and supported by the frame. When within reach of the occupants, this type is also called a roof window.

==== Retractable skylight ====
A retractable skylight rolls (on a set of tracks) off the frame, so that the interior of the facility is entirely open to the outdoors, i.e., not impeded by a hinged skylight. The terms retractable skylight and retractable roof are often used interchangeably, though skylight implies a degree of transparency.

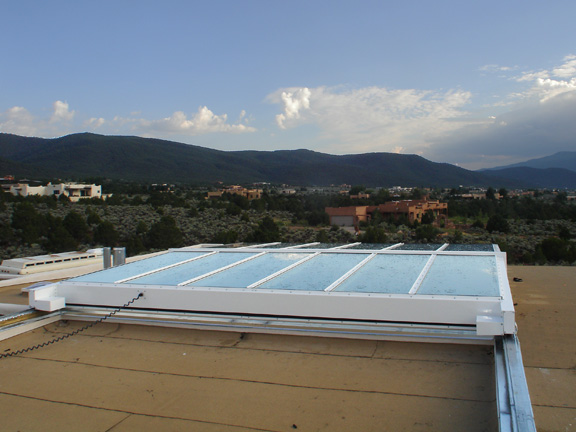
A large (20' × 20') steel and glass retractable skylight, seen from the roof. Note the steel tracks that the skylight rolls on, to retract.

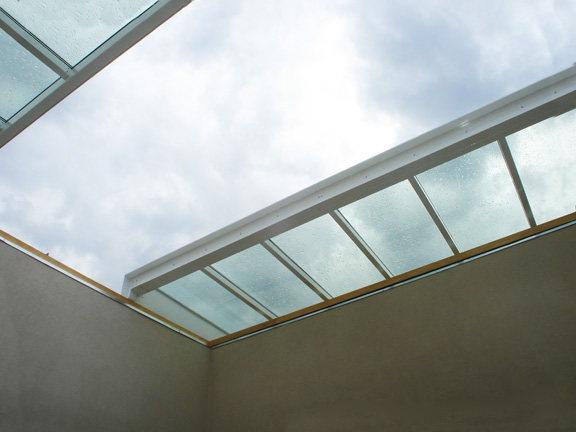
The same retractable skylight, seen from the interior. This is a bi-parting skylight, meaning that it parts in the middle to open.

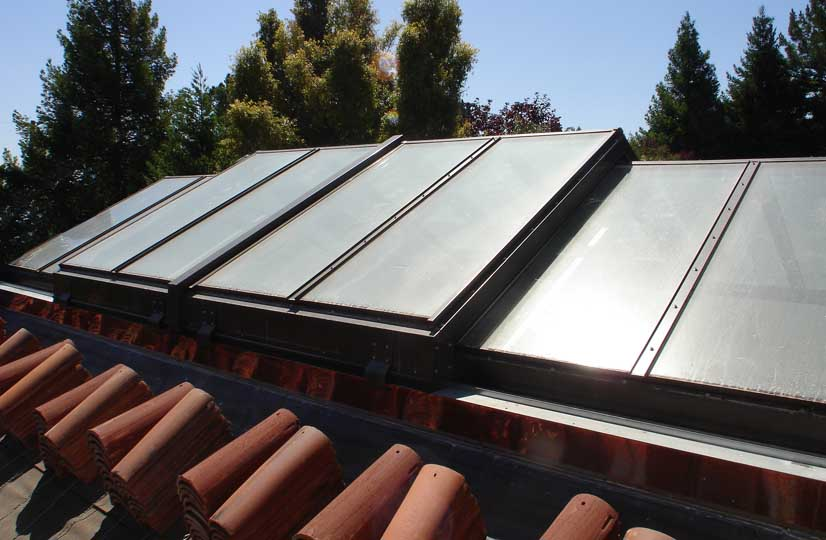
This ridge skylight wraps over the highest point of the roof – the ridgeline.

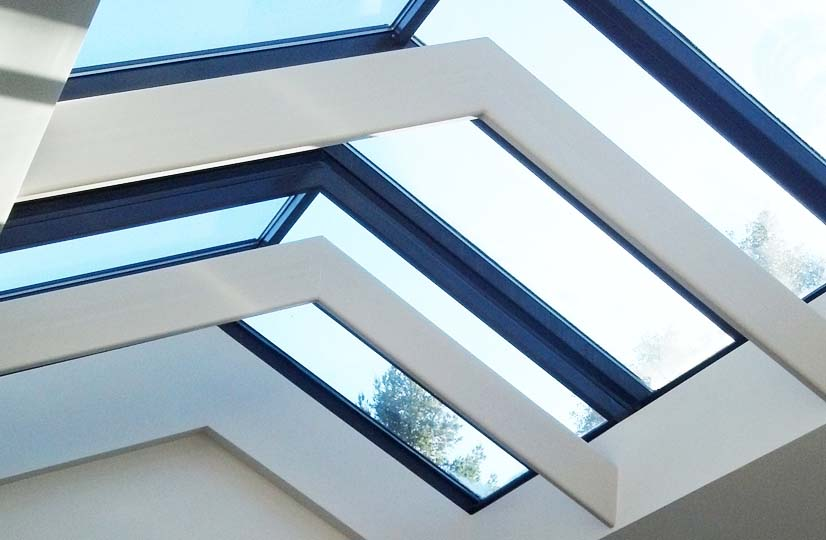
This is that same skylight, from the inside. Steel allows large spans, without a grid of supporting tubes and cables.

==== Tubular daylight device ====
Active daylighting uses a tubular daylighting device (TDD). Solar tubes, sun tunnels, or tubular skylights consist of a roof-mounted fixed unit skylight element, condensing sunlight, distributed by a light conveying optic conduit to a light diffusing element. Being small in diameter, they can be used for daylighting smaller spaces such as hallways, and bounce light in darker corners of spaces. TDDs harvest daylight through a roof-mounted dome with diameters ranging from about 10 inches for residential applications to 22 inches for commercial buildings. Made from acrylic or polycarbonate formulated to block ultraviolet rays, the dome captures and redirects light rays into an aluminum tubing system that resembles ductwork.

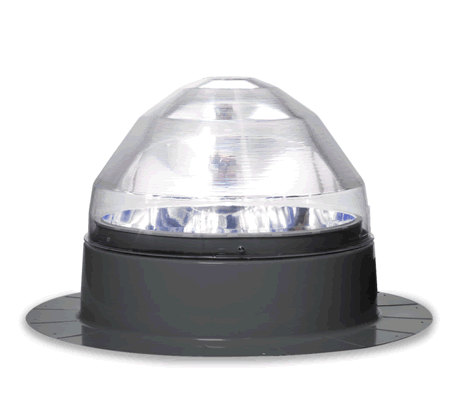
Active daylighting uses a tubular daylight device (TDD)

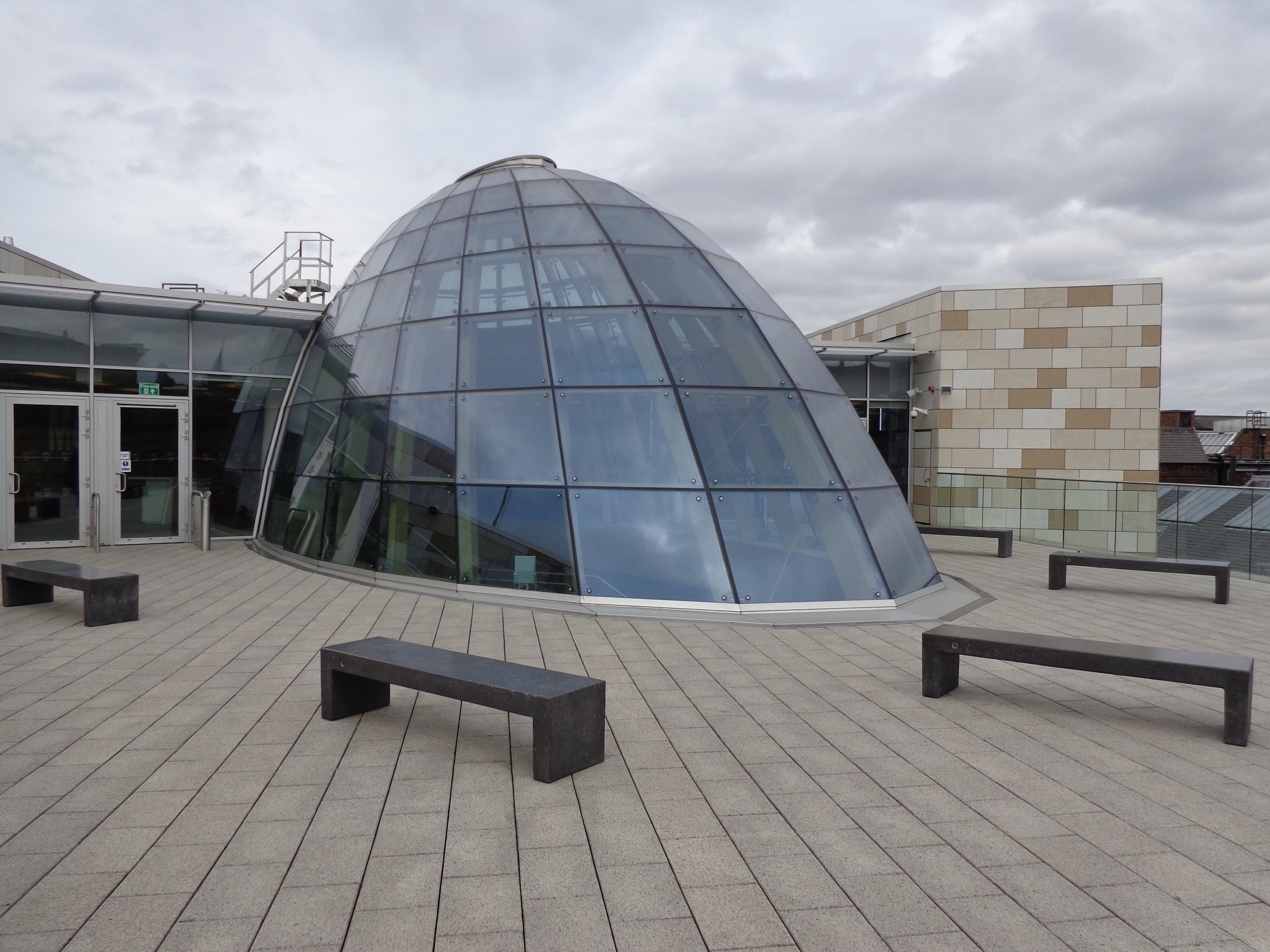
TDD skylight on the roof terrace of Liverpool Central Library

==== Sloped glazing ====
Sloped glazing differs from other "skylights" in that one assembly contains multiple infill panels in a framing system, usually designed for a specific project and installed in sections on site.

==== Pavement lights ====
Pavement lights are walk-on skylights. They are set into sidewalks, open areas, and well-lit interior floors as laylights.

==== Prism lights ====
Prism lights are sometimes used as skylights; they redirect the light passing through.

== Solar architecture ==
Solar architecture means designing buildings to use the sun's heat and light to maximum advantage and minimum disadvantage, especially in the sense of harnessing solar power. Skylights are widely used in designing daylighting for residential, public, and commercial buildings. Increased daylighting can result in less electrical lighting use and smaller sized window glazing (sidelighting), saving energy, lowering costs, and reducing environmental impacts. Daylighting can cut lighting energy use in some buildings by up to 80%.

Toplighting (skylights) works well with sidelighting (windows) to maximize daylighting:

1. toplighting is able to bring light into centralized areas of a building,
2. daylight is available throughout the day from both ambient lighting from the sky and direct exposure to the sun,
3. modern transparent and/or translucent glazing can be utilized to avoid glare, aid in capturing sunlight at low angles and diffuse light to wider areas of floor space.

Even on overcast days, toplighting from skylights is three to ten times more efficient than sidelighting.

=== Materials ===
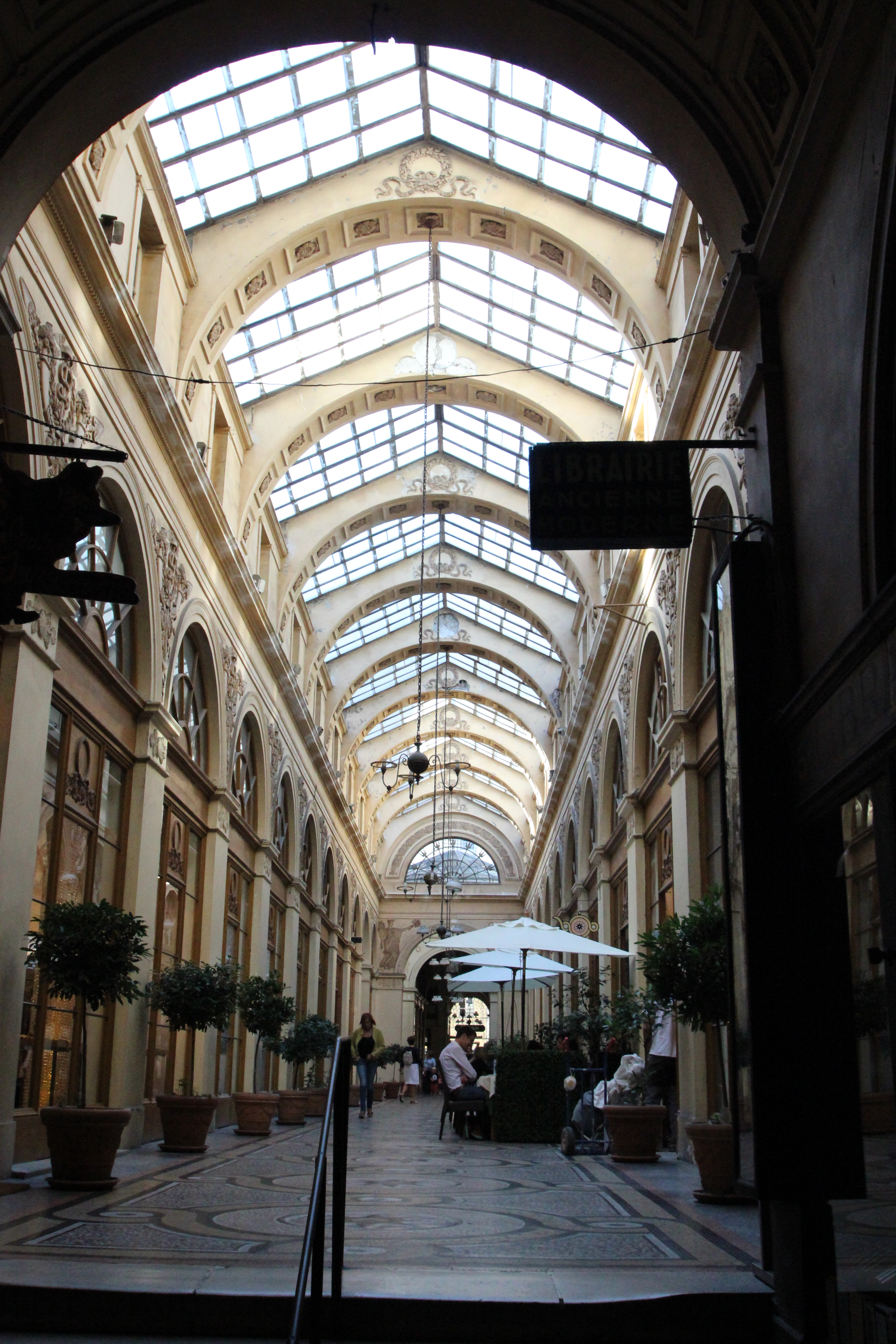
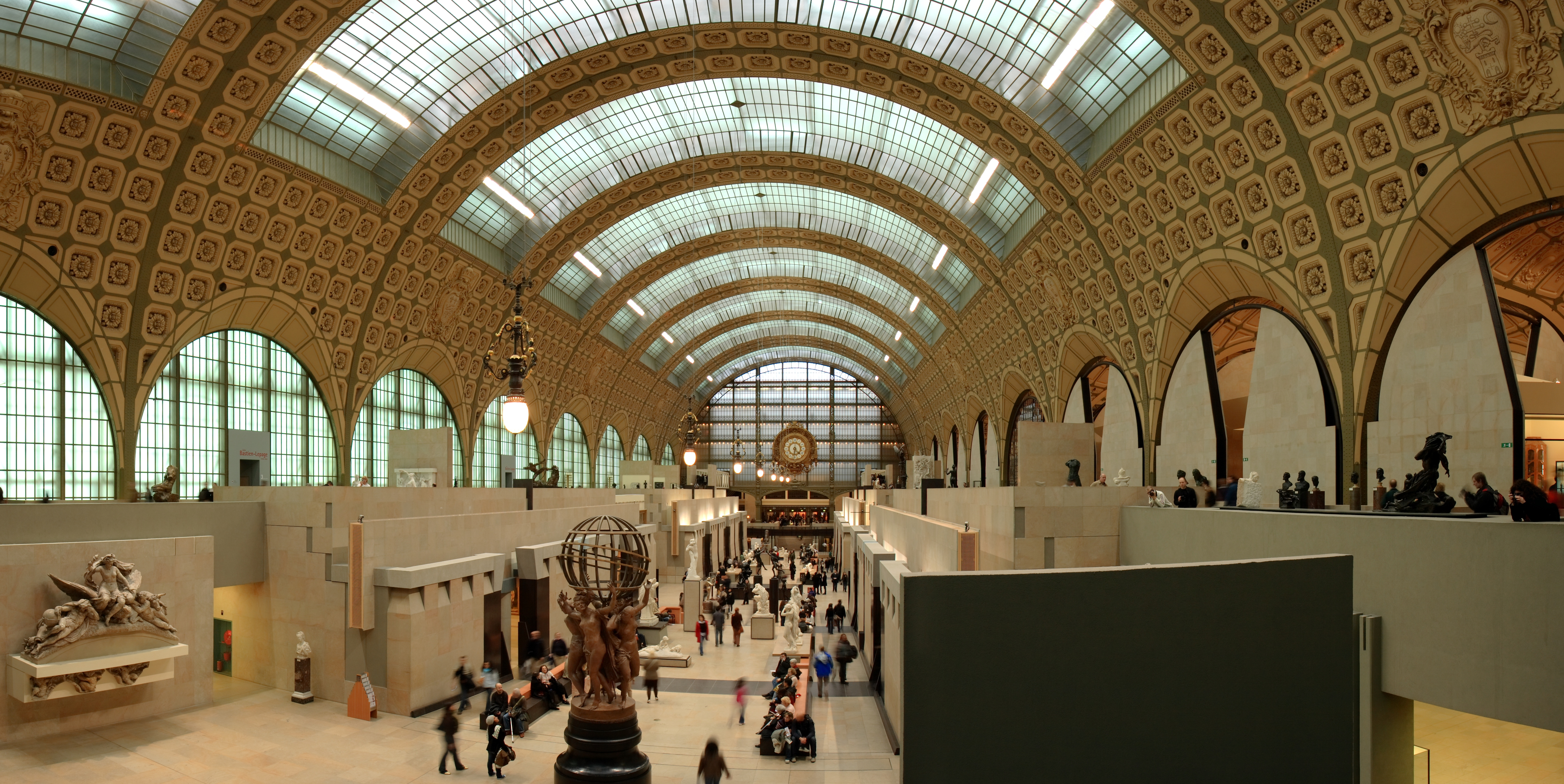
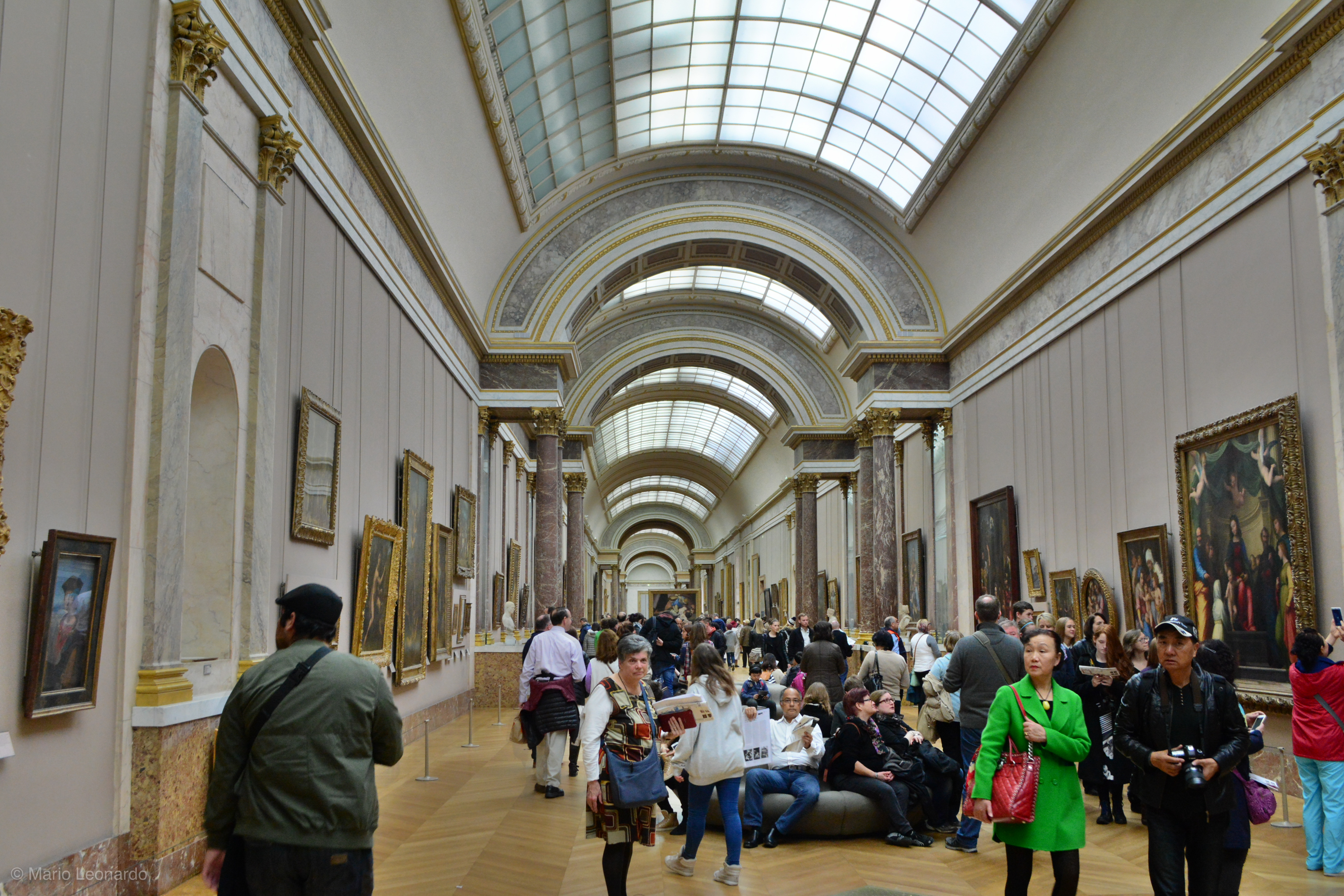
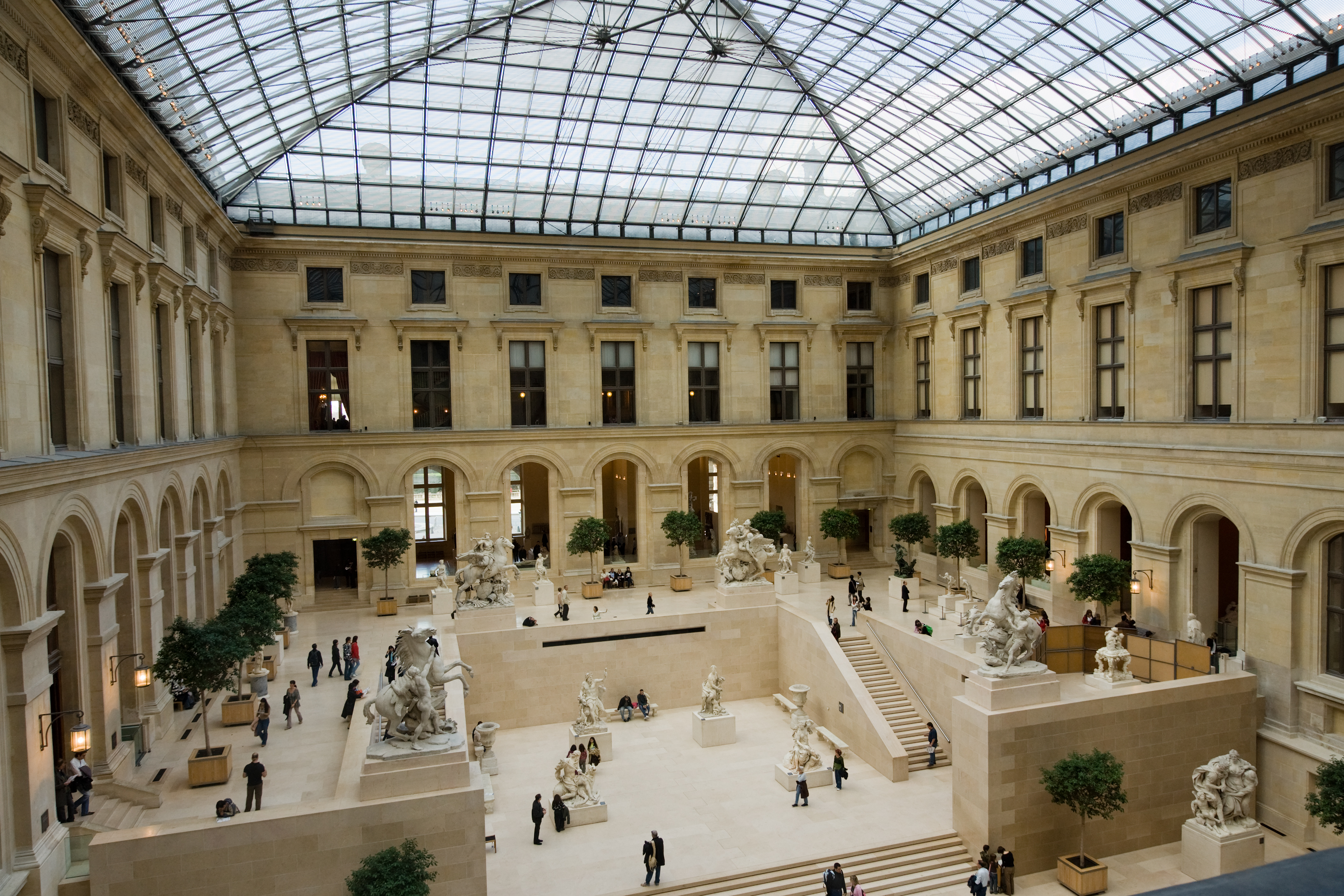
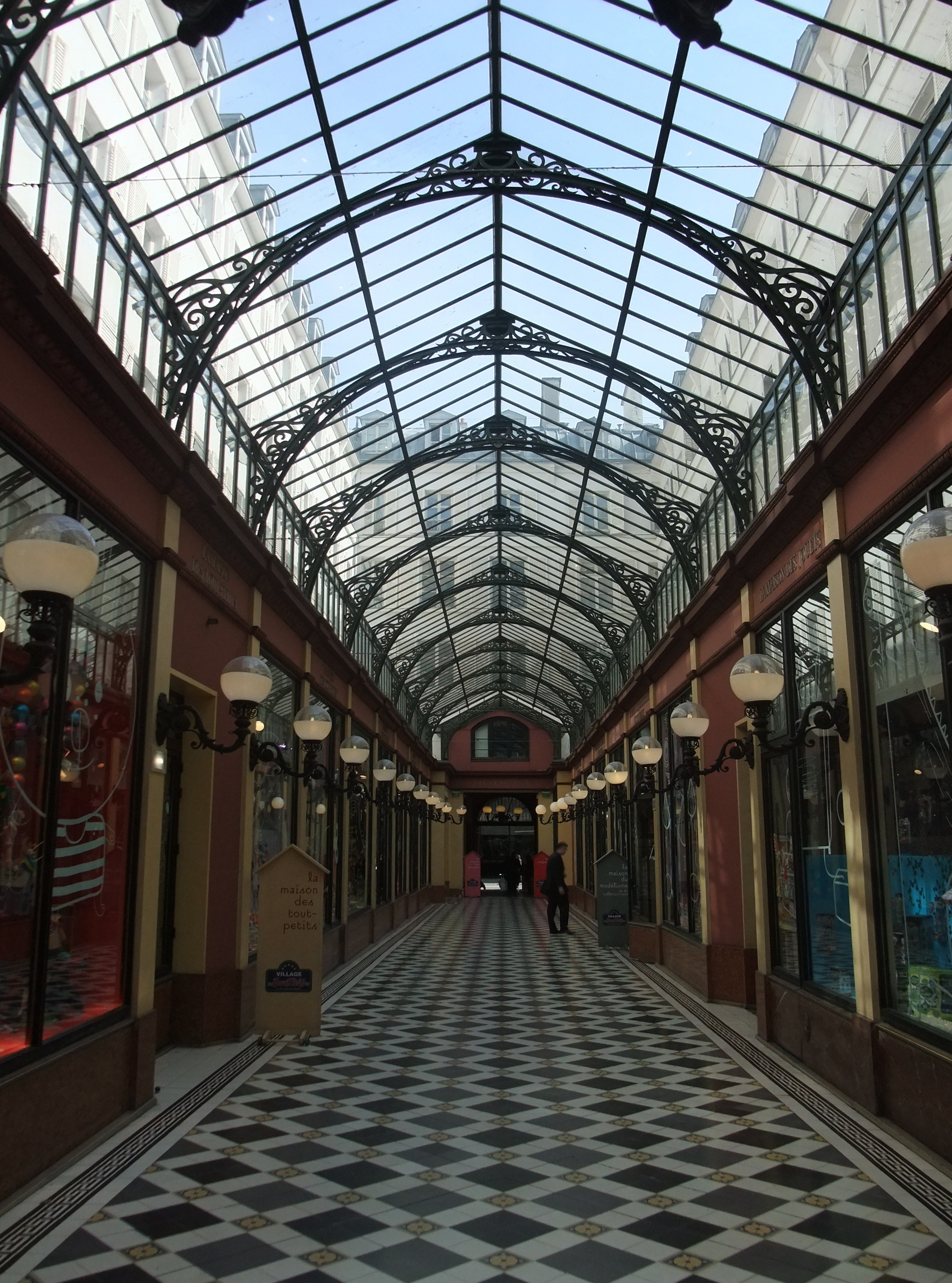
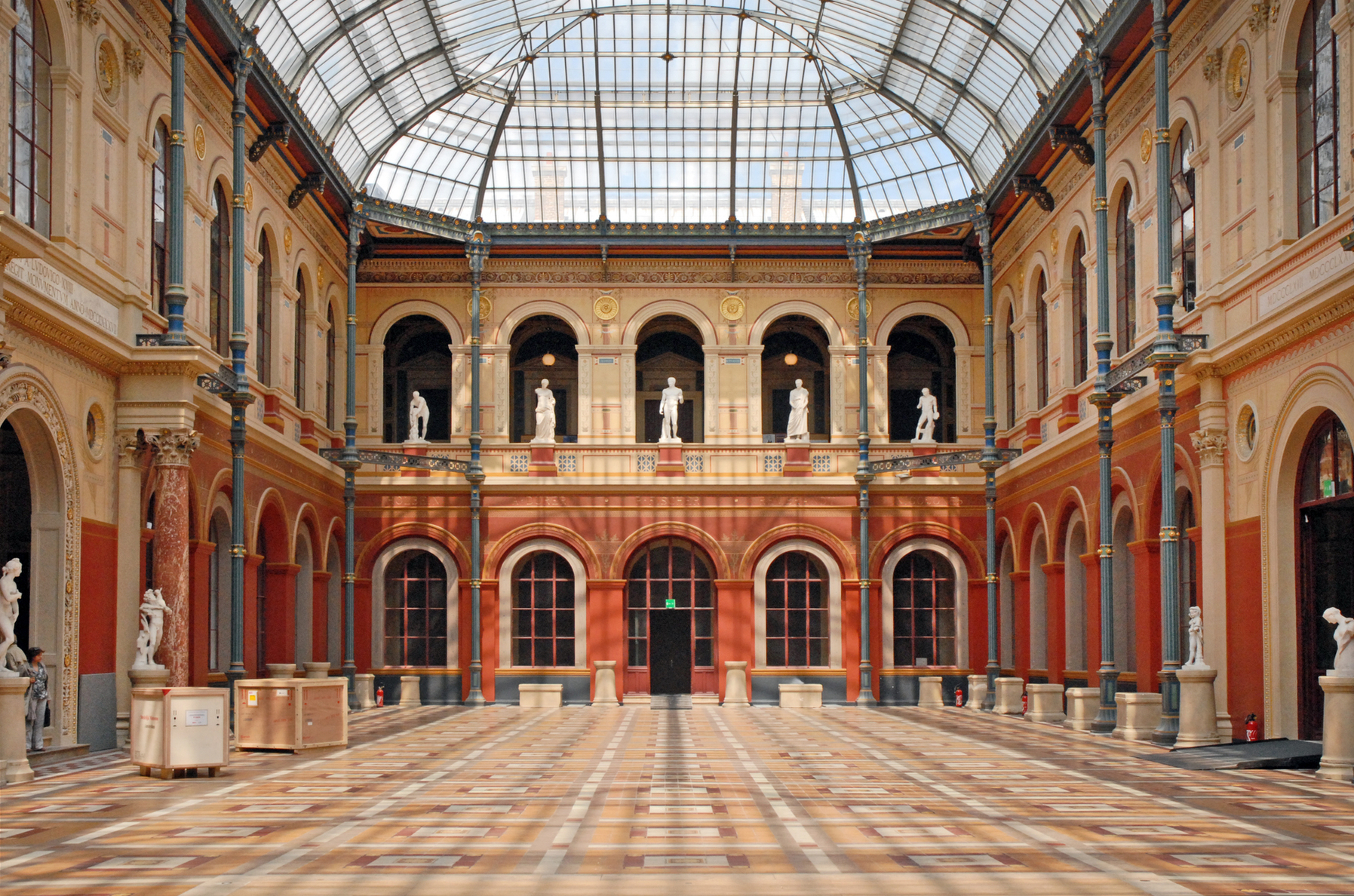
Examples of large 19th-century glass roofs

==== Glass ====
Many recent advances in both glass and plastic infill systems have greatly benefited all skylight types. Some advances increase thermal performance, some are focused on preserving and utilizing daylight potential, and some are designed to enhance strength, durability, fire resistance and other performance measures.

Contemporary skylights using glass infill (windows) typically use sealed insulating glass units (IGU) made with two panes of glass. These types of products are NFRC-ratable for visible transmittance. Assemblies with three panes can sometimes be cost-justified in the coldest climate zones, but they lose some light by adding the third layer of glass.

Glass units typically include at least one low-emissivity (Low-E) coating applied to one or more glass surfaces to reduce the U-factor and especially SHGC by suppressing radiant heat flow. Many varieties of Low-E coatings also reduce daylight potential to different degrees. High-purity inert gas is frequently used in the space(s) between panes, and advances in thermally efficient glass spacing and supporting elements can further improve thermal performance of glass-glazed skylight assemblies.

==== Plastic ====
Plastic glazing infill is commonly used in many skylights and TDDs. These assemblies typically contain thermally formed domes, but molded shapes are not uncommon. Domed skylights are typically used on low-slope roofs. The dome shape allows shedding of water and burning embers.

Plastics used in skylights are UV-stabilized and may feature other advances to improve thermal properties. Lack of accepted standards for measuring light transmittance is a disadvantage for comparing and choosing skylights with plastic glazing.

Acrylic is the most common plastic glazing used for dome skylights. However, polycarbonate and copolyester materials are also used as glazing, where additional properties such as impact resistance may be required. Ethylene tetrafluoroethylene (ETFE) is commonly used for modern indoors sports stadiums and venues, such as SoFi Stadium, U.S. Bank Stadium, and New Stadium at RFK Campus.

==== Rating systems ====
NFRC: rating for visible transmittance.

U-factor: expresses the heat-loss performance of any building assembly.

SHGC–Solar Heat Gain Coefficient: measures the assembly's transfer of heat from outside to inside that is caused by sunlight.

These properties are labeled in the U.S. as a decimal between zero and one, with lower numbers indicating lower heat transfer rates. Depending on the geographic region, optimal U-factor and SHGC performance will vary. In the sunny southern climate zones, a lower SHGC is more important than lower U-factor. In the cooler northern climate zones, lower U-factor is more important, and higher SHGC can be justified.

In selection of skylights, a balance is sought between low U-factor and optimal SHGC values, while preserving enough daylight supply to minimize artificial light use. Automatic light sensing controls for electric lighting maximize energy savings.

=== Benefits ===
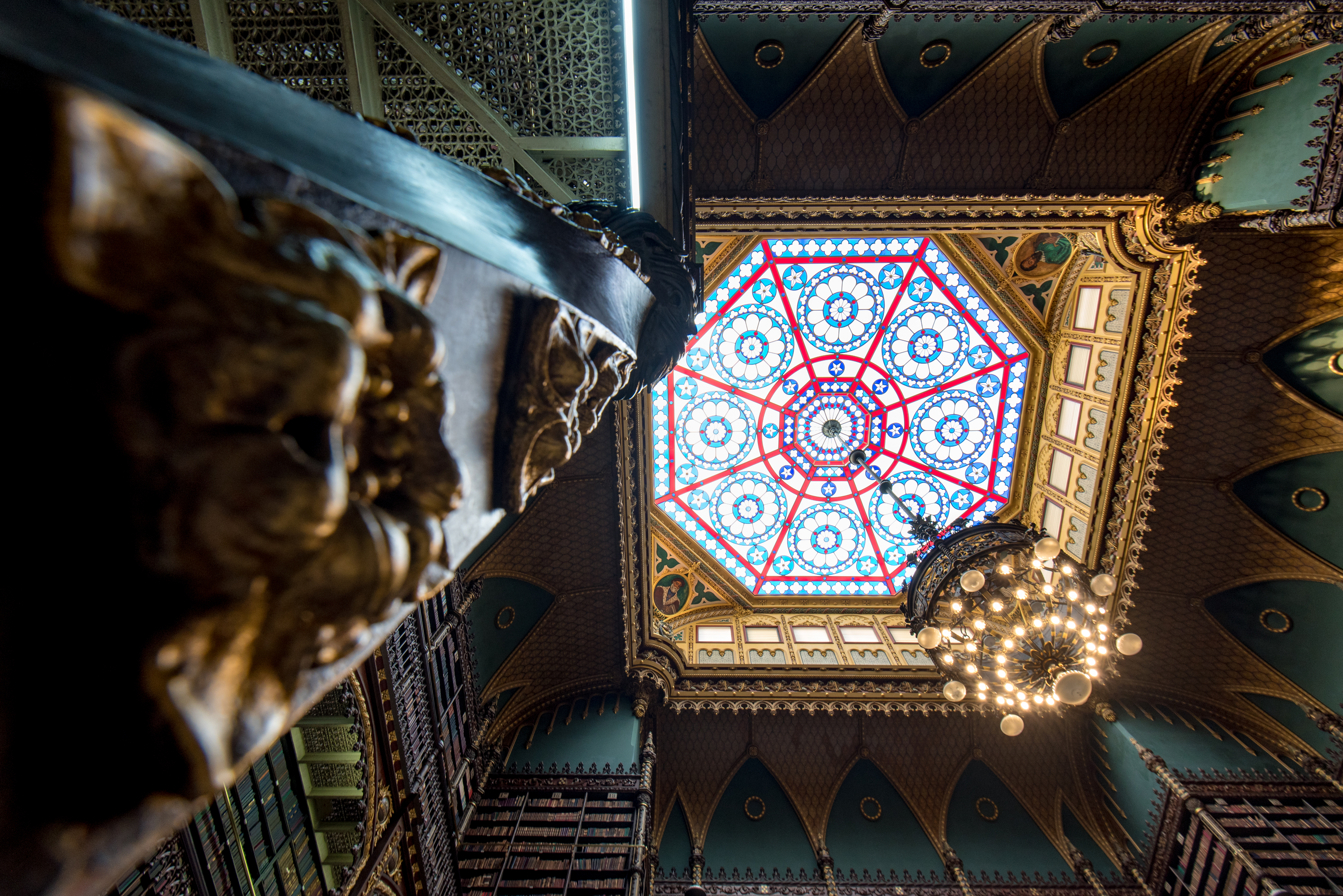
Stained-glass dome skylight in the Royal Portuguese Cabinet of Reading in Rio de Janeiro, Brazil

A study concluded that students have significantly higher test scores in classrooms that optimize daylighting, than classrooms that do not. Other studies show that daylight positively affects physiological and psychological well-being, which can increase productivity in many contexts, such as sales in retail spaces.

In terms of cost savings, U.S. DOE reported that many commercial buildings can reduce total energy costs by up to one-third through the optimal use of daylighting. The majority of commercial warehouses and "big box stores" built in recent years have used skylights extensively for energy/costs savings.

== See also ==
- Cupola
- Daylight factor
- Daylighting
- Glass brick
- Light tube
- Passive solar building design
- Roof lantern
- Roshandan
- Saw-tooth roof
- Sunroof
