= Seetzen =

Seetzen is a German surname. Notable people with the surname include:

- Heinrich Seetzen, often known as Heinz Seetzen (1906–1945), German SS officer and Holocaust perpetrator
- Helge Seetzen (born 1978), German technologist, businessman and entrepreneur
- Ulrich Jasper Seetzen (1767–1811), German explorer
