= DR37-P =

The DR37-P is an HDR monitor produced by BrightSide Technologies Inc. in 2005. It makes use of what BrightSide calls Individually Modulated LED (IMLED) technology. The targeted customers are industries like medical, CAD, film post-production, geophysical data or satellite imaging.
