= Climate based daylight modelling =

Climate based daylight modelling (CBDM) also known as dynamic daylight metrics is a calculation methodology first developed in the late 1990s to assess daylight quality and quantity. It is used by Building Design engineers and architects to predict luminance and/or illuminance within buildings using standardised sun and sky condition climate data for a given geographical location. It is a different design metric to Daylight factors which only considers the ratio of the light level inside a structure to the light level outside the structure from an overcast sky. With CBDM, if used considerately, the facade design of a building can be optimised to maximise useful daylight whilst excluding excessive daylight, which otherwise might cause issues with glare, visual discomfort, and/or solar gains which can cause thermal comfort issues. At the same time reducing reliance and operation of artificial lighting. CBDM calculations are calculated within Building simulation modelling software tools for each and every hour of the year, or sometimes for smaller increments, which allows for daily and seasonal profiles to be tested and optimised

The key metrics reported on within CBDM software are as follows:

- 'Daylight Autonomy' (DA), the amount of time that a point in a room can be expected to achieve a target level of illuminance from daylight. Normally expressed as a percentage for a useful level of illuminance to be met or exceeded, for example 300 lux
- 'Spatial Daylight Autonomy' (sDA); the amount of time that a point on the working plane in a room can be expected to achieve a target level of illuminance from daylight. The working plane is established to represent a useful working height within the space, such as at desk level. The sDA is normally expressed as a percentage target for a useful level of illuminance for a given target, for example; 50% of a 300 lux DA target on the working plane (300/50%)
- 'Useful Daylight Illuminance' (UDI-a); the summed annual occurrence of illuminance on the working plane and during the occupied hours for the space. Typically, the target may be between 100 and 3000 lux. Any hours of illuminance below 100 lux is defined as UDI-s, and typically would require artificial lighting to be switched on. Any hours of illuminance above 3000 lux is defined as UDI-e, and indicates excessive daylight which can cause visual discomfort and glare/contrast issues and typically would require blinds or curtains to be closed.

== See also ==
- Daylighting
- Right to light
- Daylight factor
