= PGF =

PGF may refer to:

- Paternal grandfather
- Paterson GlobalFoods, Canadian agrifood company
- Patterson–Gimlin film, purporting to show Bigfoot
- IATA code of Perpignan–Rivesaltes Airport, France
- Placental growth factor, a human gene
- Vector graphics language in the PGF/TikZ pair
- Precision guided firearm
- Probability-generating function
- Progressive Graphics File, a file format
