= Helge Seetzen =

German technologist and businessman (born 1978)

- Born: June 23, 1978 (age 48)
- Education: University of British Columbia
- Occupations: Technologist and Entrepreneur
- Known for: HDR
- Partner: Dominique Anglade
- Children: 3

Helge Seetzen (born June 23, 1978) is a German technologist and businessman known for imaging & multimedia research and commercialization.

Seetzen was active in the development of high dynamic range imaging (HDR) technology and several of his patents cover aspects of this technology. He won the Natural Sciences and Engineering Research Council of Canada 2009 Innovation Challenge Award for his work with HDR Technology.

== Biography ==
Seetzen left his native Germany to study physics at the University of British Columbia in 1998. He received BS and PhD degrees in physics and related disciplines from that university, where he first became active in imaging technology research that led to the development of HDR.

== Business career ==
From 2002 to 2004, Seetzen was a co-founder and director of Sunnybrook Technologies, a Vancouver-based start-up developing electronic display technologies. In 2004, the firm split, and he became co-founder and Chief Technical Officer of BrightSide Technologies, a Vancouver-based developer of High dynamic range imaging-based electronic display technologies. After Brightside was purchased by Dolby Laboratories in 2007, he joined Dolby Canada Corp., becoming director of HDR Technology at Dolby from 2008 to 2010.

In early 2010, Seetzen founded TandemLaunch, a Montreal-based technology transfer acceleration company and venture capital fund that works with academic researchers to commercialize their technological developments. Seetzen is CEO and Managing Partner of the firm, and directs the company’s strategy and operations. Under his leadership, TandemLaunch has raised four venture funds and created over 35 companies including LandR and has been recognized particularly for supporting women founders.

== Technical societies ==
Seetzen is a president of the Society for Information Display, where he has held roles including Chair of the Publications Committee, including oversight of The Journal of the SID,, Information Display magazine, and related publications, as well as, Treasurer, Secretary and currently as President-Elect of the Society. He also served as the 2010 Program Chair and 2012 General Chair of Display Week, a technical symposium on displays. He serves on the boards of several public organisations including Canada's largest academic scholarship program MITACS, the entrepreneurship program of Montreal's business school HEC and the technology transfer committee of Montreal's AI initiative IVADO. In 2018, he was appointed by the Governor General of Canada to serve on the governance council of the Natural Science and Engineering Research Council of Canada.

== Publications ==
Seetzen’s work includes contributions to published research on high dynamic range display systems, High-Luminance HDR, and photometric image processing, and of subjects related to image display, resolution, and luminance.
