= Ethiopian Immigration and Citizenship Service =

Ethiopian government agency

- የኢትዮጵያ ኢሚግሬሽንና ዜግነት አገልግሎት

Agency overview
- Formed: 6 October 2021
- Preceding agency: Immigration, Nationality and Vital Events Agency
- Jurisdiction: Ethiopia
- Headquarters: Arada subcity, Addis Ababa, Ethiopia; 9.0231°N 38.7668°E
- Agency executive: Selamawit Dawit, Director General
- Website: www.ethiopianpassportservices.gov.et

The Ethiopian Immigration And Citizenship Service (Amharic: የኢትዮጵያ ኢሚግሬሽንና ዜግነት አገልግሎት; ICS) is an autonomous Ethiopian government agency responsible for immigration, citizenship, and passport related service. It was established in 2021 by the Proclamation No. 1263/2021.

== History ==
The Ethiopian Immigration And Citizenship Service (ICS) was established on 6 October 2021 with Proclamation No. 1263/2021, transferring all duties and powers of the Immigration, Nationality and Vital Events Agency (INVEA) to ICS. The agency established as an autonomous government body. The Proclamation was revision of Proclamation No. 1263/2014 and Directive No. 449/2014.

In February 2025, ICS announced a plan to produce electronic passports locally by October 2025, with collaboration of Ethiopian Investment Holdings (EIH) and Toppan Security Share Company. This features include to enhance security, streamline travel documentation, and modernize the country's immigration system.

== See also ==
- Ethiopian passport
