= Cartesian Perceptual Compression =

Compressed image file format

Cartesian Perceptual Compression (abbreviated CPC, with filename extension .cpc) is a proprietary image file format. It was designed for high compression of black-and-white raster document imaging for archival scans.

CPC is lossy, has no lossless mode, and is restricted to bi-tonal images. The company which controls the patented format claims it is highly effective in the compression of text, black-and-white (halftone) photographs, and line art. The format is intended for use in the web distribution of legal documents, design plans, and geographical plot maps.

Viewing and converting documents in the CPC format currently requires the download of proprietary software. Although viewing CPC documents is free, as is converting CPC images to other formats, conversion to CPC format requires a purchase.

JSTOR, a United States–based online system for archiving academic journals, converted its online archives to CPC in 1997. The CPC files are used to reduce storage requirements for its online collection, but are temporarily converted on their servers to GIF for display, and to PDF for printing. JSTOR still scans to TIFF G4 and considers those files its preservation masters.

== See also ==
- Image file formats
