= Xara Designer Pro+ =

Image editing suite

- Developer: Xara Group Ltd
- Release: 1995; 31 years ago (Windows)
- Stable release: Xara Photo & Graphic Designer October 2018; / October 2018; 7 years ago
- Operating system: Windows 2000 or later
- Type: Vector graphics editor
- License: Proprietary
- Website: www.xara.com

Xara Designer Pro+ is an image editing program incorporating photo editing and vector illustration tools created by British software company Xara. Xara Xtreme LX was an early open source version for Linux.

The Windows version was previously sold under the names Xara Studio, Xara X and Xara Xtreme, and traces its origin in the late 1980s to a title called ArtWorks for the Acorn Archimedes line of computers using RISC OS. There is a pro version called Xara Designer Pro (formerly Xara Xtreme Pro).

The current commercial version of Xara Photo & Graphic Designer runs only on Windows, although Xara documents can be edited in a web browser on any platform using the Xara Cloud service. Versions up to 4.x can be run on Linux using Wine.

== History ==
ArtWorks, the predecessor of Xara Photo and Graphic Designer, was developed on Acorn Archimedes and Risc PC 32-bit RISC computers running RISC OS by Computer Concepts during the late 1980s. The first version, developed for Microsoft Windows was initially called Xara Studio. It was licensed to Corel Corporation before wide-scale public availability, and from 1995 to 2000 was released as CorelXARA. Corel ceded the licensing rights back to Xara in 2000. The first Xara X version released in 2000 by its original owner. The next version, Xara X¹, was released in 2004. Xara Xtreme was released in 2005.

In November 2006, Xara Xtreme PRO (an enhanced version of Xara Xtreme) was released. Xara Xtreme 3.2 and Xtreme Pro 3.2 were released in May 2007. 3.2 Pro included Xara3D, and both versions had more robust typography. In April 2008, Xara Xtreme 4.0 was released. Xara Xtreme and Xara Xtreme Pro 5.1 were released in June 2009. Features included more text-area enhancements, content-aware scaling of bitmap images, improved file import and export, master-page (repeated) objects, an object gallery (replacing the layer gallery), website-creation tools, and multi-stage graduated transparency. In June 2010, Xara Photo & Graphic Designer 6 and Xara Designer Pro 6 were released. Xtreme was renamed Photo & Graphic Designer, and Xtreme Pro was renamed Designer Pro. In May 2011, Xara Photo & Graphic Designer 7 and Xara Designer Pro 7 were released. Features included "magic" photo erase, user interface improvements to docking galleries and snapping alignment, and (in Pro) new webpage and website-design features.

In May 2012, Xara Photo & Graphic Designer 2013 and Xara Designer Pro X (v8) were released. Xara Photo & Graphic Designer 9 was released in May 2013. In July of that year, Xara Designer Pro X9 was released. Xara Photo & Graphic Designer 10 was released on 16 July 2014, and Xara Designer Pro X10 on 23 July. Xara Photo & Graphic Designer 11 was released on 29 June 2015, and Xara Designer Pro X11 was released the following month. In 2016, the delivery model was changed to an update service which can be renewed annually. Users are entitled to any updates released while the update service is active. The first update-service updates were in May 2016 for Xara Photo & Graphic Designer, and July 2016 for Xara Designer Pro X.

Version	Description	Release date
Xara X	commercial version	2000
Xara X¹	commercial version	2004
Xara Xtreme	commercial version with commercial plugins	2005
Xara Xtreme XS	commercial version, a light version of Xara Xtreme without plugins or bevel/shadow/outline tools	2006
Xara Xtreme PRO	commercial version with enhanced functions	2006
Xara Xtreme for Linux	open-source version	2006
Xara Xtreme, Xara Xtreme PRO 3.2	improved typography (Pro includes Xara 3D6)	May 2007
Xara Xtreme, Xara Xtreme PRO 4.0		April 2008
Xara Xtreme, Xara Xtreme PRO 5.0		June 2009
Xara Photo & Graphic Designer 6, Xara Designer Pro 6	GUI redesign and tool updates and enhancements	June 2010
Xara Photo & Graphic Designer 7, Xara Designer Pro 7		May 2011
Xara Photo & Graphic Designer 2013, Xara Designer Pro X (v8)		May 2012
Xara Photo & Graphic Designer 9		May 2013
Xara Designer Pro X9	combines photo, graphics, page layout, and web design	July 2013
Xara Photo & Graphic Designer 10, Designer Pro X10		July 2014
Xara Photo & Graphic Designer 11		June 2015
Xara Designer Pro 11		July 2015
Xara Photo & Graphic Designer with update service		May 2016
Xara Designer Pro X with update service		July 2016
Most recent update-service update		October 2018

== Features ==
Xara Photo & Graphic Designer is known for its usability and fast renderer. It provides a fully anti-aliased display, advanced gradient fill, and transparency tools.

Among vector editors, Xara Photo & Graphic Designer is considered to be fairly easy to learn, with similarities to CorelDRAW and Inkscape in terms of interface. Alongside the vector illustration tools, Xara Photo & Graphic Designer also includes an integrated photo tool offering manual and automatic photo enhance, cropping, adjustment of brightness levels, red-eye fix, 'magic' erase, photo healing, color and background erase, panoramas and content aware resizing. Designer Pro includes a wider range of tools for other design tasks including the creation of web pages and websites, and text and page layout tools for DTP with the aim of providing a single solution for all graphic and web design tasks.

== See also ==
- .xar file format
- Comparison of vector graphics editors
- Comparison of raster-to-vector conversion software
