= Image Cytometry Standard =

- Filename extensions: .ics, .ids
- Size limitation: No limit
- Type of format: Image file formats
- Compression: Lossless
- Open format?: Yes

The Image Cytometry Standard (ICS) is a digital multidimensional image file format used in life sciences microscopy. It can store not just the image data, but also the microscopic parameters and settings used during the image acquisition.

ICS was first proposed in: P. Dean, L. Mascio, D. Ow, D. Sudar, J. Mullikin, "Proposed standard for image cytometry data files" in the journal Cytometry.

The original ICS version 1 file format used two separate files: a text header file with .ics extension and another much larger .ids file, that contains the actual image data. This allowed for compression of the data while leaving the header file accessible. On the other hand, the newer ICS version 2 file format uses only one single .ics file with both the header and the image data together.

The .ics in the two-file format is a text file with fields separated by tabs, and lines ending with a newline character. In the newer ICS2 format this text header precedes the binary data.

The ICS format is capable of storing:

- multidimensional and multichannel data
- images in 8, 16, 32 or 64 bit integer, 16, 32 or 64 bit floating point and floating point complex data
- all microscopic parameters directly relevant to the image formation
- free-form comments
