= BrightSide Technologies =

Former Canadian technology firm

BrightSide Technologies Inc.
- Type: Private
- Industry: Electronics
- Founded: 2004
- Headquarters: Vancouver, British Columbia, Canada
- Key people: Richard MacKellar, CEO, and Helge Seetzen, CTO
- Products: Electronic display technologies
- Number of employees: 20

BrightSide Technologies Inc. (formerly Sunnybrook Technologies) was a firm spun-out from the Structured Surface Physics Laboratory of the University of British Columbia, developing and commercializing electronic display technologies, specifically high brightness display technology called HDR. The privately held company also developed technology for capturing, processing, and storage of HDR images. BrightSide's headquarters were in Vancouver, British Columbia, Canada. It was acquired by Dolby Laboratories, Inc. in April 2007 for US$28 million.

The chief executive officer of BrightSide Technologies Inc. was Richard MacKellar. The chief technology officer was Helge Seetzen, who went on to join Dolby as becoming director of HDR Technology at Dolby (2008 to 2010), before going on to found TandemLaunch, a Montreal-based technology incubator.

The main electronic display technology developed by BrightSide was based on IMLED-LCD which consisted of a LCD with an array of individually modulated LED semiconductors as the backlights, instead of cold cathode fluorescent lamps (CCFL) that diffuse light in a layer of plastic. Each LED has 256 brightness steps, where step 0 switches the LED off and step 255 switches it to maximum luminance. As a result, the device can display true black and very bright white, with a contrast ratio technically of infinity, where minimal luminance is 0 cd/m^{2} (the denominator) and maximal luminance is almost 4,000 cd/m^{2}. To address the confusion that may accompany a display with a quoted contrast ratio of infinity, Brightside calculates its quoted contrast ratio using the next-darkest level available on the display to arrive at a contrast ratio of 200,000:1.

BrightSide produced a prototype display to showcase their technology: the DR37-P. Targeted industries include the medical field, CAD, film post-production, geophysical data and satellite imaging.

On April 25, 2007 Dolby Laboratories, Inc. announced that it completed the acquisition of Brightside Technologies. (Dolby, the company responsible for licensing its surround-sound technologies to consumer electronics manufacturers.) Dolby renamed the BrightSide technology to Dolby Vision. In 2009, SIM2 Multimedia announced the professional version of their Solar Series display using it would be available Q2 2010 with 16 bits per color, and a contrast ratio of 1,000,000:1 (19.9 stops).

In 2011, Sony announced that they had acquired the license to use the Dolby Vision technology in their Bravia LCD HDTVs.

In 2010 Dolby released the Dolby Professional Reference Monitor (Dolby PRM-4200), followed by the PRM-4220 in 2013. The Dolby team who developed the Dolby Professional Reference Monitor received an Oscar at the 2016 Academy Awards. Among the Dolby employees on stage to receive the award was Thomas Wan, one of the BrightSide employees who originally started working on the technology while a student at the University of British Columbia.
