= Xar (graphics) =

Vector graphics file format of Xara and Xara Photo & Graphic Designer

The Xar file format is the fully specified vector graphics file format of Xara and Xara Photo & Graphic Designer.
