= EasyHDR =

High Dynamic Range image processing software

easyHDR
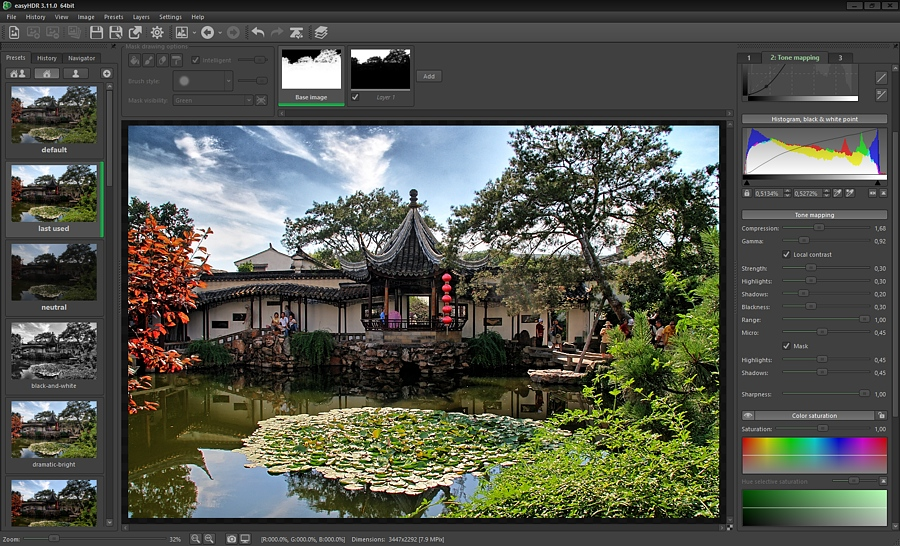
- Developer: Bartłomiej Okonek
- Stable release: 3.17 / November, 25th, 2025
- Operating system: Microsoft Windows, Mac OS X
- Type: High dynamic range imaging
- License: Proprietary
- Website: www.easyhdr.com

EasyHDR is a High Dynamic Range (HDR) image processing software that merges differently exposed photographs into HDR radiance map and tone maps them. With a single photograph, easyHDR can be used to increase contrast and refresh colors (LDR enhancement mode).

== Functionality ==
EasyHDR is designed for use under macOS and Microsoft Windows. It works on Linux under Wine.

Via dcraw and LibRaw, easyHDR supports the handling of raw image files. Lens correction (distortion and chromatic aberration) is addressed based on the LensFun database.

EasyHDR allows for batch processing. To this end, the user may save custom presets for tone mapping.

=== HDR image processing ===
The functionality of easyHDR with respect to HDR image processing includes:

- image alignment (manual and automatic), compensating for shift, rotation, scale and perspective,
- HDR ghost effect removal,
- noise filtering,
- layers (masking with brushes and gradient tool).

=== LDR enhancement ===
In case of a single low-dynamic-range (LDR) photograph, which often is missing details in highlights or shadows, the tone mapping of easyHDR may be used to increase contrast and refresh colors. This is in particular the case when developing raw images.

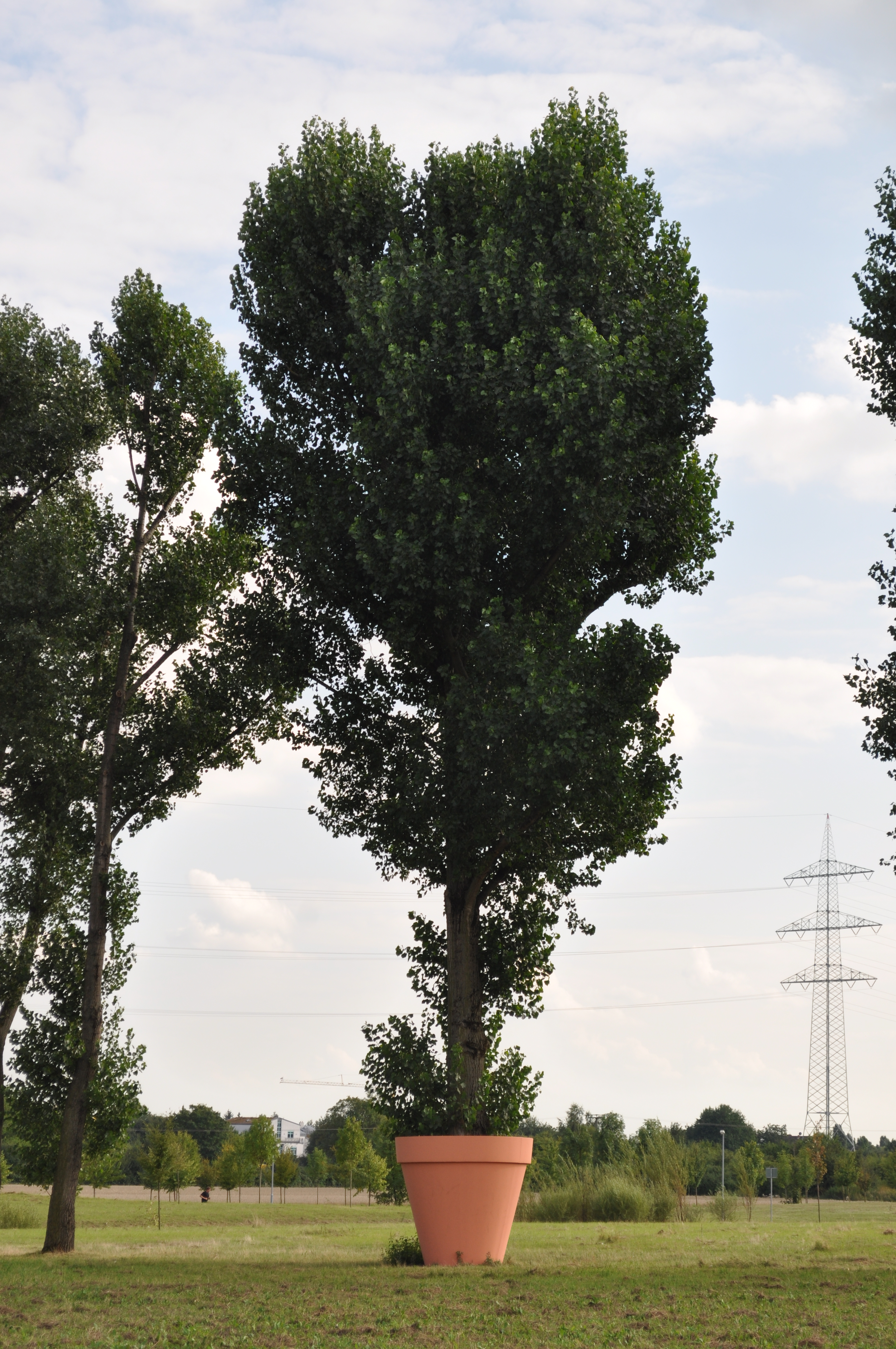
JPG image, as downloaded from the camera

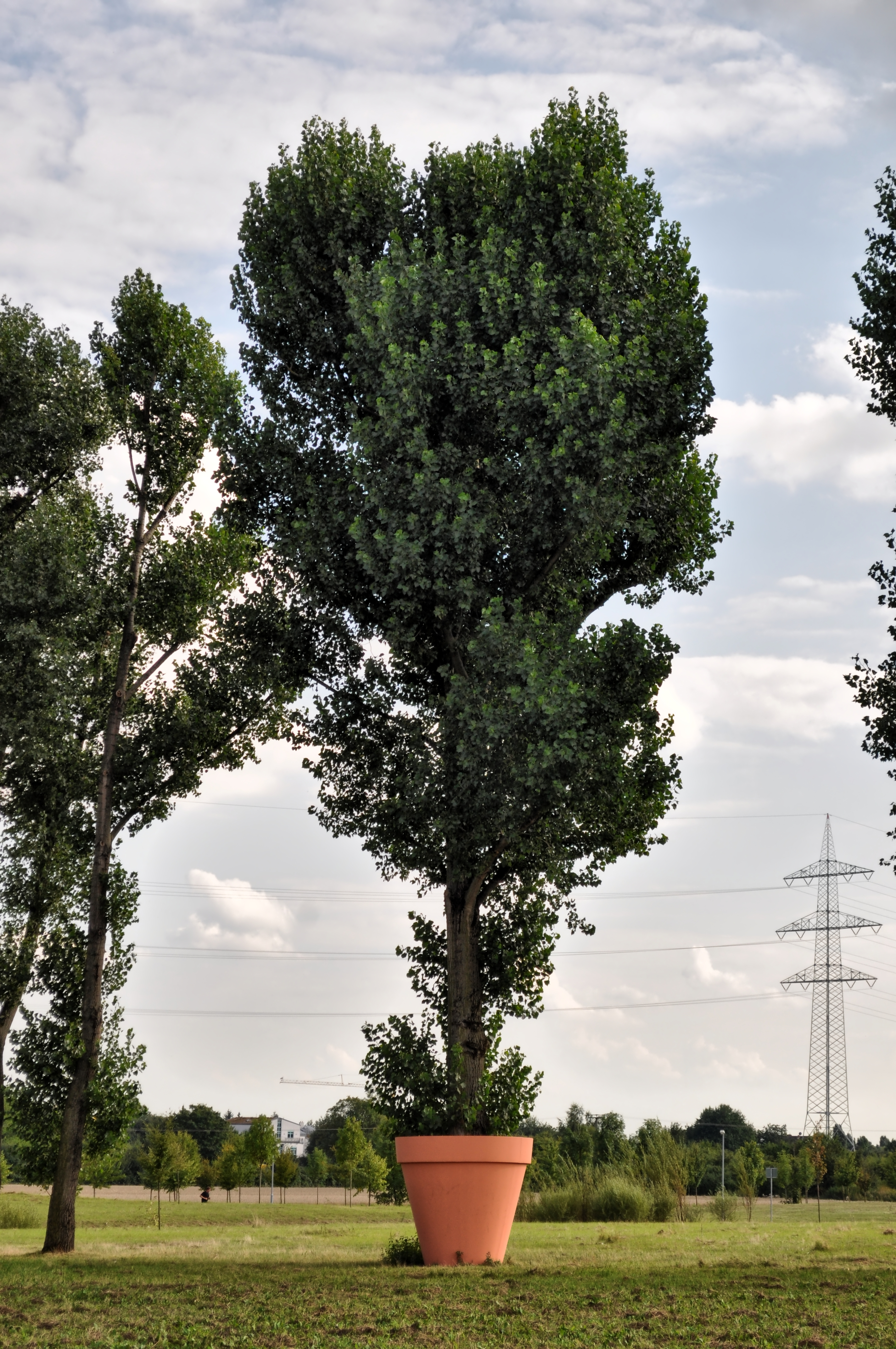
Image generated by easyHDR (mode "LDR enhancement", preset "standard")

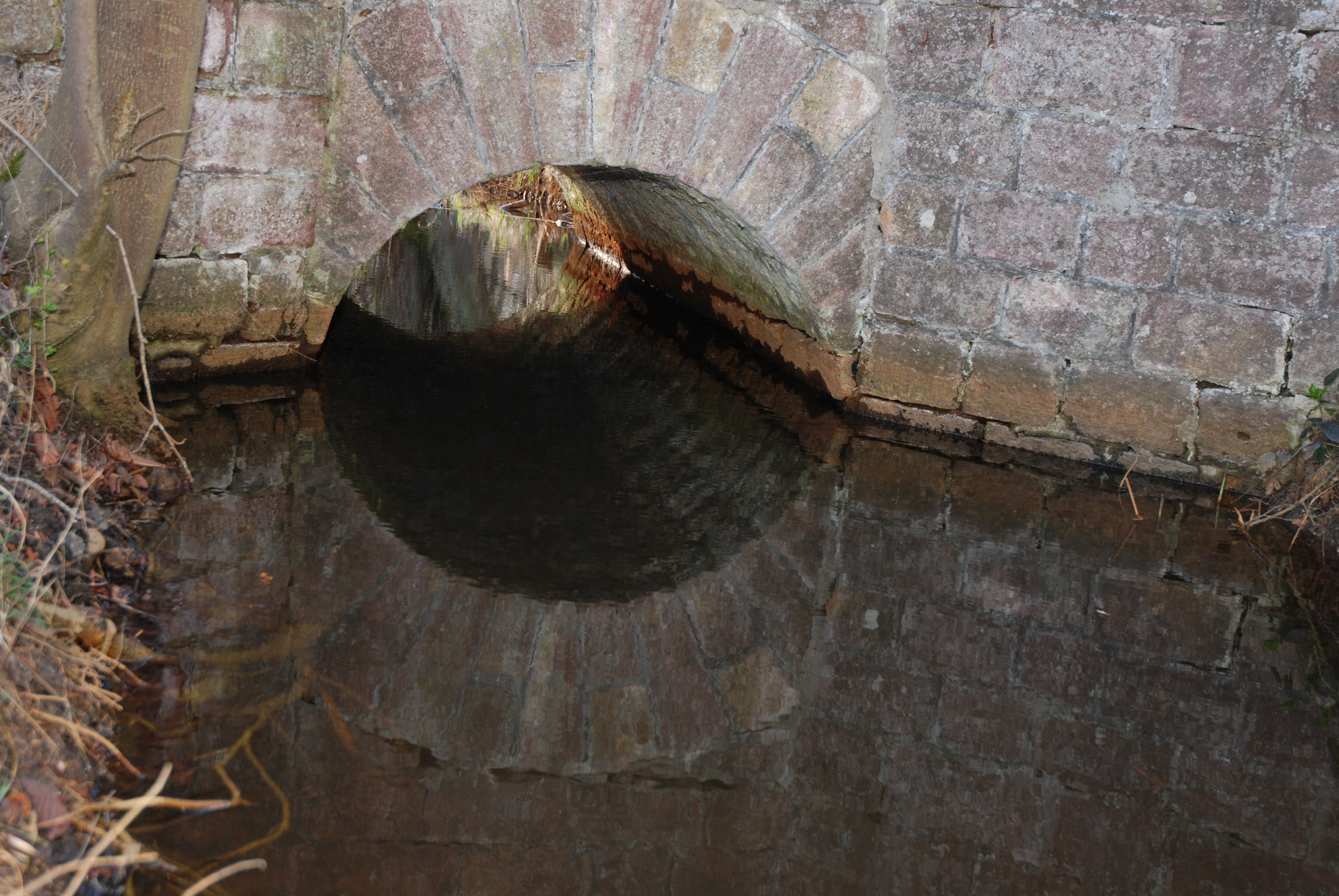
JPG image, as downloaded from the camera

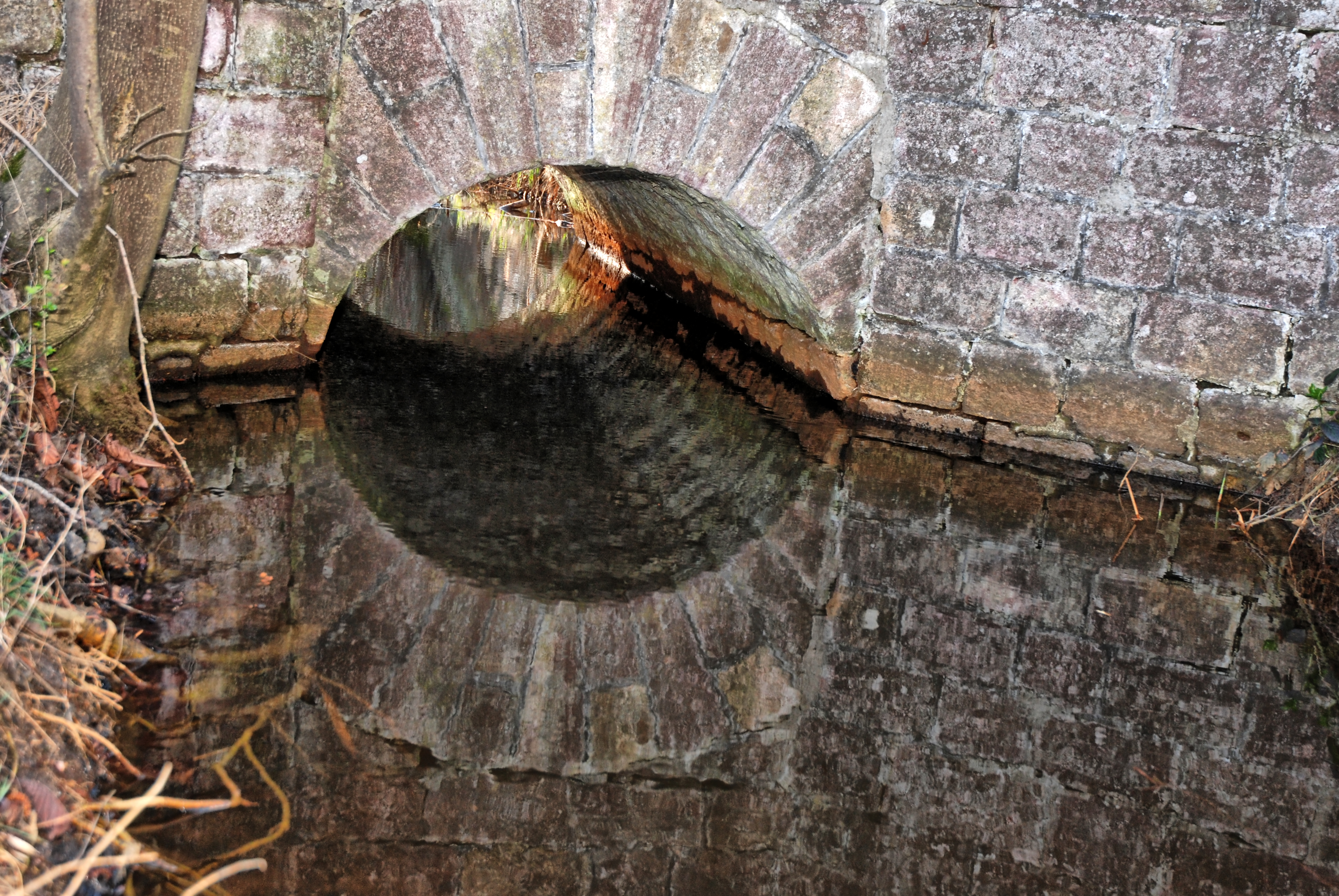
Image generated by easyHDR from the corresponding RAW file (mode "LDR enhancement", preset "standard")

=== Lightroom plug-in ===
EasyHDR is shipped with a plug-in for Adobe Lightroom that allows exporting photos (original or pre-processed) from Lightroom to easyHDR for processing and finally storing the output results into the Lightroom catalog.

== Making-of ==
EasyHDR was developed by Bartłomiej Okonek in 2006, then studying at Wrocław University of Science and Technology, Poland, in particular for use in astrophotography.

The HDR generation and tone mapping algorithm is also used by FARO Scene LT point cloud viewing software.
