= Comparison of digital and film photography =

Topic of debate in Photography

The merits of digital versus film photography were considered by photographers and filmmakers in the early 21st century after consumer digital cameras became widely available. Digital photography and digital cinematography have both advantages and disadvantages relative to still film and motion picture film photography. In the 21st century, photography came to be predominantly digital, but traditional photochemical methods continue to serve many users and applications.

== Image quality ==
=== Spatial resolution ===
The visual quality of a digital photograph can be evaluated in several ways. The pixel count of an image is related to its spatial resolution and is often used as a figure of merit. The quantity of picture elements (pixels) in the image sensor is usually counted in millions and called "megapixels". Sensor pixel density sets a limit on the final output resolution of images captured with that sensor. Other factors, such as the effect of a Bayer pattern or other filter on the digital sensor and the image processing algorithm used to interpolate raw sensor data to image pixels. Most digital sensors are arranged in a rectangular grid pattern, making certain images (for example of parallel lines) susceptible to moiré pattern artifacts. Film is not affected by moiré because of the random orientation of the silver salts in its emulsion, however the pattern of these silver salts may become visible upon enlargement, creating the patterns called "grain" in the final output.

The resolution of film images depends upon the area of film used to record the image (35 mm, medium format or large format) and the film speed. Estimates of a photograph's resolution taken with a 35 mm film camera vary. More information may be recorded if a fine-grain film is used, while the use of poor-quality optics or coarse-grained film may yield lower image resolution. A 36 mm × 24 mm frame of ISO 100-speed film was initially estimated to contain the equivalent of 20 million pixels, or approximately 23,000 pixels per square mm.

Many professional-quality film cameras use medium-format or large-format films. Because of the relatively large size of the imaging area these media provide, they can record higher resolution images than most consumer digital cameras. Based upon the above pixel density, a medium-format film image can record an equivalent resolution of approximately 83 million pixels in the case of a 60 x 60 mm frame, to 125 million pixels in the case of a 60 x 90 mm frame. In the case of large format, 4 x 5 inch films can record approximately 298.7 million pixels, and 1,200 million pixels in the case of 8 x 10 inch film. However, as with a digital system, poor optical quality of lenses will decrease the resolving potential of a film emulsion.

=== Noise and grain ===
Shot noise, produced by spontaneous fluctuations in detected photocurrents, degrades darker areas of electronic images with random variations of pixel color and brightness. Film grain becomes obvious in areas of even and delicate tone. Grain and film sensitivity are linked, with more sensitive films having more obvious grain. Likewise, with digital cameras, images taken at higher sensitivity settings show more image noise than those taken at lower sensitivities.

However, even if both techniques have inherent noise, it is widely appreciated that for color, digital photography has much less noise/grain than film at equivalent sensitivity, leading to an edge in image quality. For black-and-white photography, grain takes a more positive role in image quality, and such comparisons are less valid.

Noise in digital cameras can produce color distortion or confetti-like patterns, in indoor lighting typically occurring most severely on the blue component and least severely on the red component. Nearly all digital cameras apply noise reduction to long-exposure photographs to counteract noise due to pixel leakage. For very long exposures, the image sensor must be operated at low temperatures to prevent noise affecting the final image. Film grain is not affected by exposure time, although the marginal sensitivity of the film changes with lengthy exposures, a phenomenon known as reciprocity failure.

=== Autofocus and auto exposure systems ===
Traditional exposure metering and autofocus systems employ secondary sensors, whose readings are typically low-fidelity (e.g. a very small number of averaged readings from various image areas vs. fully resolved image information) and may not correspond to the actually recorded image, for example due to parallax issues, differing sensitivity towards polarization, differing spectral response, differing amplitude response, optical aberrations of optical elements in the sensing system, differing sensitivity towards stray light, or misalignment of the focal plane of the sensor. Most digital cameras allow users to capture and analyze image information from the same sensor as used for image recording in real-time. Using this information for exposure and focus determination inherently eliminates most alignment and calibration issues, while simultaneously eliminating the cost of secondary metering sensors.

=== White balance ===
Film typically assumes using separate films to account for white balance of scene (typically in two variants: for sunlight or tungsten lamps), or usage of filters. Many film cameras had a dial to help user keep track of type of film that was loaded in the camera.

=== Dynamic range ===
Dynamic range is a significant factor in the quality of both the digital and emulsion images. Both film and digital sensors exhibit non-linear responses to the amount of light, and at the edges of the dynamic range, close to underexposure and overexposure the media will exhibit particularly non-linear responses. The non-linear dynamic response or saturation qualities of emulsion film are often considered a desirable effect by photographers, and the distortion of colour, contrast and brightness varies considerably between film stocks. There is a continuous but relatively limited range of colour levels on emulsion film, whereas a digital sensor stores integer numbers, producing a wide range of discrete levels of colours. Banding may be visible in the unusual case that it is not obscured by noise, and detail may be lost, particularly in shadow and highlight areas.

Digital camera manufacturers have made consistent improvements in the dynamic range captured by their products, with modern cameras having over 14 stops of dynamic range. Some cameras have an automatic exposure bracketing mode, to be used in conjunction with high-dynamic-range imaging software. Analog output media also have more limited dynamic range they are able to display relative to pigment-based inkjet media.

=== Convenience and flexibility ===
Flexibility and convenience are among the reasons for the widespread adoption of digital cameras. With film cameras, a roll is usually completely exposed before being processed. When the film is returned, it is possible to see the photograph, but most digital cameras incorporate a liquid crystal display that allows the image to be viewed immediately after capture. The photographer may delete undesired or unnecessary photographs, or reshoot the image if required. A user who wants prints can quickly and easily print just the required photographs.

Photographic film is made with specific characteristics of colour temperature and sensitivity (ISO). Lighting conditions often require characteristics different from those of the film specifications, requiring the use of filters or corrections in processing. Digital photography allows colour temperature and sensitivity to be adjusted at each shot, either manually or automatically.

Digital images may be conveniently stored on a personal computer or in off-line storage such as small memory cards. Professional-grade digital cameras can store pictures in a raw image format, which stores the output from the sensor, rather than processing it immediately to form an image. When edited in suitable software, such as Adobe Photoshop or the GNU program GIMP (which uses dcraw to read raw files), the user may manipulate certain parameters, such as contrast, sharpness, or colour balance before producing an image. JPEG images can be similarly manipulated, though usually less precisely; software for this purpose may be provided with consumer-grade cameras. Digital photography allows the quick collection of a large quantity of archival documents, bringing convenience, lower cost, and increased flexibility in using the documents.

There are some areas where film may have some advantages. Modern film cameras are not as power-thirsty as modern digital cameras and can last longer on smaller batteries. Some film cameras, especially older ones, can operate without batteries: some will function completely without batteries, while others may lose some functionality such as metering and some shutter speeds. Batteries that only have to power light meters are often very small and can last a long time. This can be a boon for those who may be spending a long time with little or no access to electricity or a source of batteries.

=== Film speed ===
Compared to film, digital cameras are capable of much higher speed (sensitivity to light) and can perform better in low light or very short exposures. The effective speed of a digital camera can be adjusted at any time, while the film must be changed in a film camera to change the speed. However, film is available in much lower film speeds than digital, which rarely drop below an ISO of 100 or 400. A number of color films are sold with an ISO of 50, which allows for a smooth, low-grain image in high-light conditions. Meanwhile, black-and-white films are sold with even higher light sensitivity, such as ISO 20 or 25. As of 2022, the lowest ISO commercially sold is 0.8 (FPP Super Positive), which allows for extremely high-contrast images to be taken.

=== Cleanliness ===
Dust on the image plane is a constant issue for photographers, and especially so in digital photography. DSLR cameras are especially prone to dust problems because the sensor remains in place, whereas a film advances through the camera for each exposure. Debris in the camera, such as dust or sand, may scratch the film; a single grain of sand can damage a whole roll of film. As film cameras age, they can develop burs on parts inside the film advance chamber. With a digital SLR, dust is difficult to avoid but is easy to rectify using a computer with image-editing software. Some digital SLRs have systems that remove dust from the sensor by vibrating or knocking it, sometimes in conjunction with software that remembers where dust is located and removes dust-affected pixels from images.

Compact digital cameras are fitted with fixed lenses, which makes it harder for dust to get into the image area. Similar film cameras are often only light-tight and not environmentally sealed. Some modern DSLRs, like the Olympus E-3, incorporate extensive dust and weather seals to avoid this problem.

== Cost ==
Film and digital imaging systems have different cost emphases. Digital cameras are significantly more expensive to purchase than film equivalents. Prices are however dropping rapidly due to intense competition. Film cameras, on the other hand, are quite inexpensive to purchase, especially used equipment, but require ongoing film and development costs. However, in the digital realm, it could be argued that the constant state of technological change will cause a digital user to keep upgrading and buying other equipment once their digital camera becomes quickly obsolete. Other costs of digital photography include specialized batteries, memory cards and long-term data storage. The cost of digital editing software can be considerable, especially if newer features are required. The emergence of very high quality phone cameras since the early 2010s are making lower end, small sensor digital cameras redundant, almost as quickly as they grew the decade before in the 2000s. Consequently, manufacturers are focusing attention to premium models such as compact system cameras and large sensor compacts. Mobile phones such as the iPhone X, Samsung Galaxy S8 and the Nokia Lumia 1020 are capable of images that can rival or beat cheaper dedicated cameras. Inkjet printers can make low-quality prints cheaply and easily from digital files, but high-quality inkjet printing has costs comparable to wet photo process printing, regardless of initial image source.

== Film industry ==
There are film industry specific arguments in the film vs. digital debate.

Most digital cinema is displayed in 2K or 4K resolution; 2K is only a small amount more resolution than the consumer-oriented 1080p HD format.

High-profile film directors such as Christopher Nolan, Paul Thomas Anderson and Quentin Tarantino have all publicly criticized digital cinema and digital cinematography, and advocated the use of film and film prints. Most famously, Tarantino suggested in 2012 that he wanted to retire because (although he can still shoot on film) he cannot project on 35mm prints in most American cinemas, because of the rapid conversion to digital. Paul Thomas Anderson recently was able to create the most 70mm film prints in years for his film The Master. There also are many film directors such as Peter Jackson, Guillermo del Toro, George Lucas, and James Cameron who are adamant supporters of digital cinema and the potential for higher frame rates that it brings.

== See also ==
- Image sensor format
- Photographer
