= ORF format =

Olympus raw image format

Olympus Raw Format (ORF)
- Filename extension: .orf
- Internet media type: image/x-olympus-orf, image/x-raw-olympus
- Developed by: Olympus
- Type of format: raw image format

The Olympus RAW Format (ORF) is a proprietary raw image format used in Olympus digital cameras. Like all other raw formats, this one contains image information rendered directly by a camera's sensor. ORF files feature so-called headers that present image characteristics, such as saturation, color temperature, contrast, etc. Headers also contain metadata, which includes camera's technical characteristics.

dcraw and LibRaw support loading ORF files.

== Overview ==
ORF files can be thought of as a format of "digital negatives." Just like film negatives, they are not usually intended to be directly viewed. Instead, ORF files contain all necessary information to create (or "develop") a usable image, in a more common format, with processing software.

Because ORF images come out without undergoing any processing, they present almost real color and shade characteristics, and they are more open for extensive editing than JPEG or TIFF images. ORF files have to be copied to a PC's hard disk, and then one can resort to an extensive array of adjustments. The format allows users to achieve maximum precision by setting their own white balance and saturation values, which is not feasible in JPEG or TIFF.

This approach is used by experienced professional and devoted amateur photographers. ORF files contain 12, 14 or more bits per pixel per channel, whereas JPEG images have only 8 bits per pixel per channel.

== File name syntax ==
ORF file names can contain information about the colour space and the date on which they were taken. By default the names use the following syntax:

Character	Meaning
1st	Colorspace: "_" for Adobe RGB or "P" for sRGB.
2nd	Month "1-9": Jan-Sep. "A-C": Oct-Dec.
3rd & 4th	Day "01-31"
5th - 8th	Running auto numbering

Example: PC071138.ORF. This was taken in the sRGB colorspace on December 7 with the number 1138 generated by the camera. The year is not encoded.

In all except the very oldest cameras the first character in the file name can be chosen freely. Some photographers use this to identify the camera in which they were taken.

== See also ==
- List of cameras supporting a raw format
