= OpenRAW =

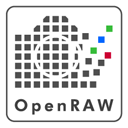
Logo

OpenRAW was an initiative to raise awareness of a serious problem with top-end digital photography and to help solve that problem. The problem concerns long-term access and viewing of the raw images often used by professional and experienced amateur photographers. OpenRAW's solution (also their motto) was "Digital Image Preservation Through Open Documentation".

This initiative was primarily an international (non-political) advocacy and lobby activity directed at companies making digital cameras and those developing software to support those cameras. It also had the aim of raising awareness of the problem among photographers. Its resources included a website with a discussion forum, and many registered supporters, including individuals, companies, and professional organizations.

== Formation ==
Early in 2005, Juergen Specht and the members of his mailing list D1scussion began to identify concerns about the difficulties associated with the proprietary RAW files introduced by camera makers.

The background to these concerns, described at Raw image format (Drawbacks), Digital Negative (Objectives), and dcraw (Motivation), is that the photographs from top-end digital cameras are often contained within files whose specifications are formally known only to the camera manufacturers. Not only does this require extra software development by many companies after the launch of most new camera models, but there is a major risk that future software products will not be able to render photographs from decades earlier.

As the seriousness of the issue was quickly realized, this team founded an initiative called OpenRAW, with the goal of encouraging image preservation and ensuring that the creators of the images retained the choice of how their images are processed.

OpenRAW was launched worldwide via a press release on 25 April 2005. There were positive reactions worldwide: for example at DPReview; many others in English; some in German; and in Japanese.

== Achievements ==
=== Raising awareness ===
The OpenRAW initiative identified the seriousness of this problem, articulated it in a way that photographers understood, summarized the solution with their "motto", and created a (non-commercial) global brand ("OpenRAW") which encapsulated all of these. The team were not the first to understand these problems, and didn't claim to be. They were primarily photographers, (rather than companies with commercial interests in cameras or image processing products, or archivists), with the advantage that they spoke to other photographers in their own language, rather than, for example, the language of archivists.

The OpenRAW initiative raised awareness, or crystallized vague awareness, of these problems with many photographers and organizations worldwide.

Camera manufacturers were made aware of the disquiet about their policies. One of them, Sony, responded with a letter held on the OpenRAW website, while others didn't respond when asked. There is no evidence that any of them changed their policies as a result of the OpenRAW initiative.

=== Supporters worldwide ===
At OpenRAW's peak there were over 1600 registered individual supporters from across the world, writing in English but sometimes as a second language. Nearly thirty software and hardware companies registered their support, thirty "photographic resources" were supporters, and so were five professional organisations.

Its influence was wider than these numbers would indicate. When it conducted a survey (in English) in 2006, more than 19,200 photographers worldwide responded to it. (From North America, 46%; Europe, 43%; Asia, 5%; Australia, 4%; Africa, 1%; South America, 1%). Twenty photography associations, forums, listservs, and other resources worldwide supported the survey.

What these supporters typically have in common was the conviction that people and organizations should reliably be able to access and view their photographs well into the future, and that this requires open documentation of the formats of the files used. While popular image file formats such as JPEG are openly documented, most raw image formats, often used by professional and experienced amateur photographers, are not.

=== Resources created ===
The OpenRAW website, especially the non-forum parts identified above, represent views of many companies and organizations other than camera makers.

The results of the survey continue to be available as a resource, but must be read with caution because it was conducted in 2006.

Another resource, often cited on the web and still pertinent, is an article "The RAW Flaw", jointly authored by Michael Reichmann (of The Luminous Landscape) and Juergen Specht (leader of the founding group of OpenRAW), and published on each website. Permission is given for the text to be copied and republished, with translation if desired, and there are examples in various countries and languages, especially of the "Act Now" call for action: in China (in English); in French; different versions in Spanish; in Danish; and in Italian.

== Limitation ==
=== Summary of the problem ===
The problem identified by the sources identified above can be summarized as: "there is an ever increasing number of undocumented raw file formats". The final paragraph in "The RAW Flaw" on The Luminous Landscape website is:

"Finally, consider the problems of digital asset management and the cataloging of files. ... The various asset management programs can't hope to keep up with the ever increasing number of proprietary formats. And as time passes and these programs are enhanced, what are the chances that they will still be able to read your older RAW files?"

And it summarizes the solution as:

"The Solution? There really is only one solution – the adoption by the camera industry of...
A. Public documentation of RAW formats; past, present and future
or, more likely...
B. Adoption of a universal RAW format"

=== Stance from launch, April 2005 ===
From April 2005, OpenRAW continued to pursue its goal of open documentation of proprietary formats rather than creation of a "universal" file format.

"We want camera manufacturers to publicly document their RAW image formats - past, present, and future. ... Many have suggested (and Adobe has created) a common, open file format for RAW image files for all camera makers to use as a solution to the RAW problem. A common, openly documented RAW format would fulfill many of the goals of OpenRAW, but is likely to face significant resistance from manufacturers who feel their "creativity" and ability to innovate would be constrained. Open documentation of all RAW file formats by manufacturers is the quickest and most satisfactory way for OpenRAW's goals to be reached."

The phrase "(and Adobe has created)" above refers to Adobe's DNG (Digital Negative Format), launched 7 months before OpenRAW. DNG was designed (among other things) as an archival raw image format and has a published specification.

=== Stance from April 2006 ===
From April 2006, OpenRAW's stance was opposed to DNG and language supporting DNG initiative was removed from "The RAW Problem" article. An article "Notes on the future of Open RAW formats, and a look at DNG" said "DNG is not the answer". Opposition was present in the forum. In an interview, a founder of OpenRAW said "No, DNG is unfortunately not a solution."

Rather than advocating for the creation of an open file format (such as DNG), OpenRAW was seeking specifications for the various proprietary file formats. This stance continued as DNG became better established while camera makers showed no signs of publishing documentation for their raw file formats.

== Status in 2011 ==
=== Status of OpenRAW initiative ===
The OpenRAW Mailing List was closed to new members in April 2006.

The OpenRAW website became inactive in August 2009, but the last post was a year earlier. By May 2011 a new home page summarized the history of OpenRAW, saying:

"While the final goal of "Open Documentation" has not yet been reached, the OpenRAW initiative and the survey results have triggered the ongoing development of an "Open" RAW standard which is in the final stages of becoming a reality."

"OpenRAW had a lot of impact on the world of photography and it continues to aim at improving the situation for photographers and their photographs for years to come."

=== Status of cameras and camera makers ===
Niche and some smaller camera makers use DNG as a raw image format, and so conform to OpenRAW's requirement by using an openly documented non-proprietary format.

The larger camera makers, such as Canon, Nikon, Olympus, and Sony, continue to use raw image formats that are not openly documented, and so still cause the problems identified by OpenRAW. A variety of DNG converters enables the undocumented proprietary formats used by the larger camera makers to be manually converted to DNG.

=== Professional image archivists and conservationists ===
Increasingly, professional archivists and conservationists, working for respectable organizations, variously suggest or recommend DNG for archival purposes.

== See also ==
- dcraw
- LibRaw
