= Michael Reichmann =

Canadian photographer, videographer, author, and entrepreneur

Michael H. Reichmann
- Born: 25 June 1944; England
- Died: 18 May 2016 (aged 71); Toronto, Ontario, Canada
- Resting place: Mount Pleasant Funeral Centre, Toronto, Canada
- Siglum: MR
- Education: Bachelor in Philosophy and Political Science
- Known for: Batteries Included, Luminous Landscape; Luminous Endowment for Photographers
- Spouse: Teya Wendie Flaster

Michael H. Reichmann (25 June 1944 – 18 May 2016), better known by his monogram MR, was a Canadian landscape, travel and street fine-arts photographer, as well as videographer, author, blogger, workshopper, independent technical consultant, camera tester, software developer and entrepreneur.

Reichmann was the president of Batteries Included in the mid-1980s. In his various capacities at Batteries Included, he was frequently interviewed in consumer and industry publications such as InfoWorld.

He founded one of the earliest web sites dedicated to photography, The Luminous Landscape (LuLa), between 1995 and 1997. In 2014, he created the Luminous Endowment project, a charitable fund to assist talented photographers through grants. Both projects are continued by Kevin Raber and others.

Reichmann proposed a new digital exposure method called exposing to the right (ETTR) in 2003. He was also an advocate of open raw image file formats.

Reichmann died in 2016 of bladder cancer.

== See also ==
- Canadian Broadcasting Corporation (CBC)
- Sinar
- Panasonic
- Voice over IP
- The Nature Conservancy
- OpenRAW
