= Sony Cyber-shot DSC-R1 =

Sony DSC-R1
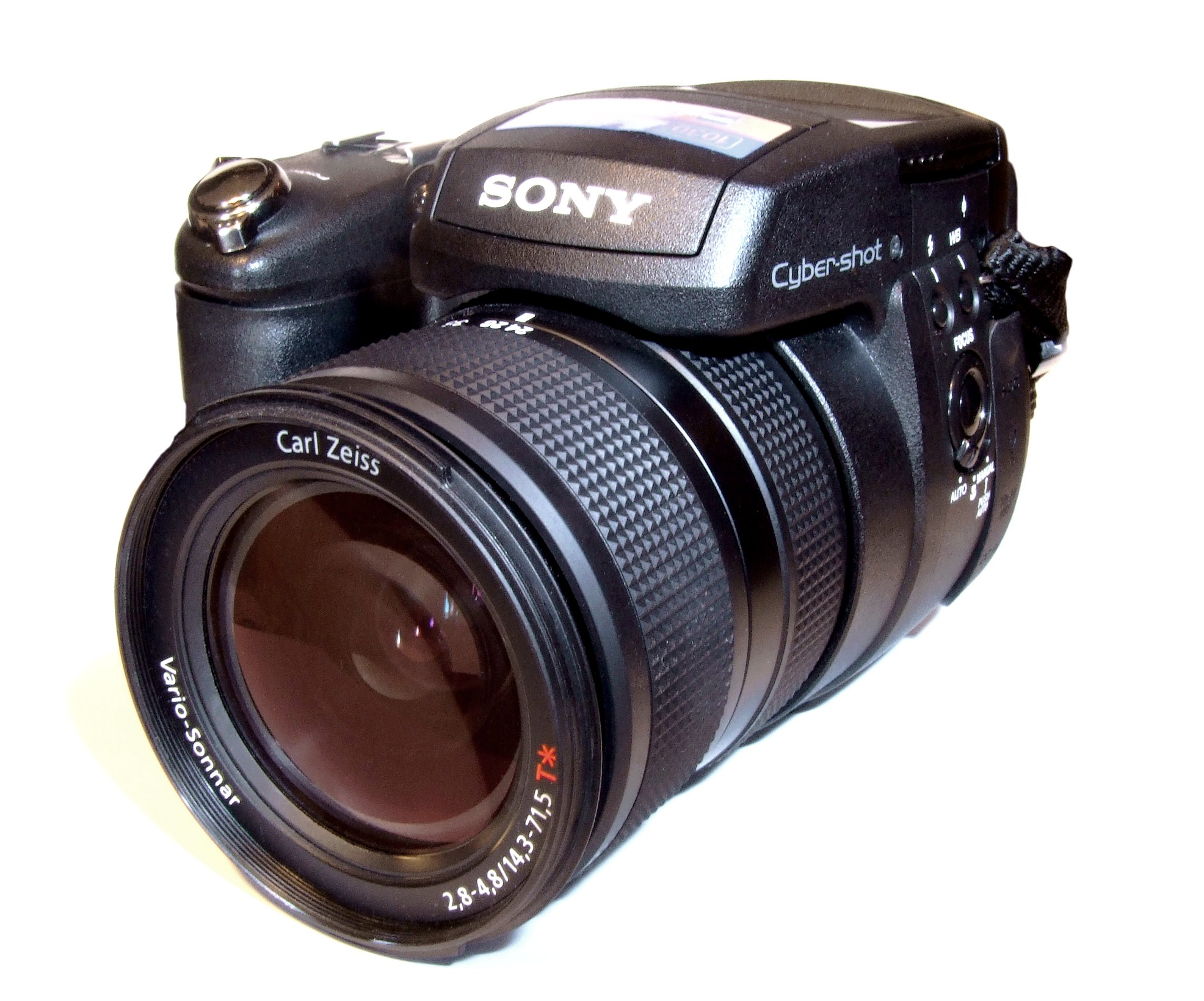

Overview
- Maker: Sony Group
- Type: Bridge digital camera

Lens
- Lens: Fixed, 14.3–71.5 mm Carl Zeiss Vario-Sonnar T*, 24–120 mm equiv. (5× zoom)

Sensor/medium
- Sensor: 21.5 mm × 14.4 mm CMOS
- Maximum resolution: 3,888 × 2,592 (10 million)
- Film speed: 160, 200, 400, 800, 1600, 3200
- Storage media: Memory Stick (PRO), CompactFlash (CF) (Type I or Type II), Microdrive

Focusing
- Focus modes: Single, Monitor, Continuous
- Focus areas: Multi-point AF (5 area auto select), Centre AF, Spot AF (flexible)

Shutter
- Shutter speed range: 30–1/2000 s + bulb (3 minutes)
- Continuous shooting: 3 frames @ 3.0 frame/s

Viewfinder
- Viewfinder: Electronic with diopter adjustment, 235,200 pixel 0.44" TFT LCD

General
- LCD screen: 2.0" top mounted flip and twist
- Weight: 995 g (35 oz) or 2.2 lb (including battery)

The Sony Cyber-shot DSC-R1 is a bridge digital camera announced by Sony in 2005. It featured a 10.3 megapixel APS-C CMOS sensor (21.5 × 14.4 mm), a size typically used in DSLRs and rarely used in bridge cameras (which were using at that time 2/3" (= 6.6 × 8.8 mm) or 1/1.8" (= 5.3 × 7.1 mm)). This was the first time such a large sensor was incorporated into a bridge camera. Besides the APS-C sensor, the DSC-R1 also featured a 14.3–71.5 mm Carl Zeiss Vario-Sonnar T* lens, providing for an angle of view equivalent to 24–120 mm on a full frame camera.

== Advantages ==
Compared to a standard DSLR the Sony DSC-R1 had the following advantages:

- since there is no mirror between the sensor and the lens, the lens can be positioned closer to the sensor, which improves the performance at wide angle. The back focal length of the DSC-R1 in wide-angle mode is 2.1 millimeters, which is much smaller than the wide angle back focal length found typically in DSLRs (up to 30 millimeters and more)
- the image in the EVF and LCD screen is bright and the light is amplified. An optical viewfinder instead does not amplify the light, so that it becomes difficult to frame and manually focus when there is not sufficient light.
- Less dust problems, since the DSC-R1 can't change lens; nevertheless dust can enter while zooming for the volume change 'pumping' the air in and out.
- silent operation, as there is no swinging mirror or physical shutter system
- as there is no shutter system there is essentially no limit to flash sync; photographs can be taken in broad daylight with fill flash at speeds of 1/1,000" or faster
- fewer movable parts, therefore greater reliability
- With histogram screen display 'on' the screen/viewer displays the output from the processor, enabling very accurate exposure control - Full-time Live Preview (serial no 4534457).
- supports RAW

== Disadvantages ==
and the following disadvantages:

- no interchangeable lenses: the supplied lens only covers the 24–120 mm zoom range.
- no optical viewfinder. Furthermore, there is some small time shift, i.e. the image appears with a small delay.
- Low frame rate and slow contrast-detection autofocus.

== See also ==
- Sony RX1
- Sony RX10
- Sony RX100
- List of large sensor fixed-lens cameras
