= Rawstudio =

Free software dedicated to RAW digital photography

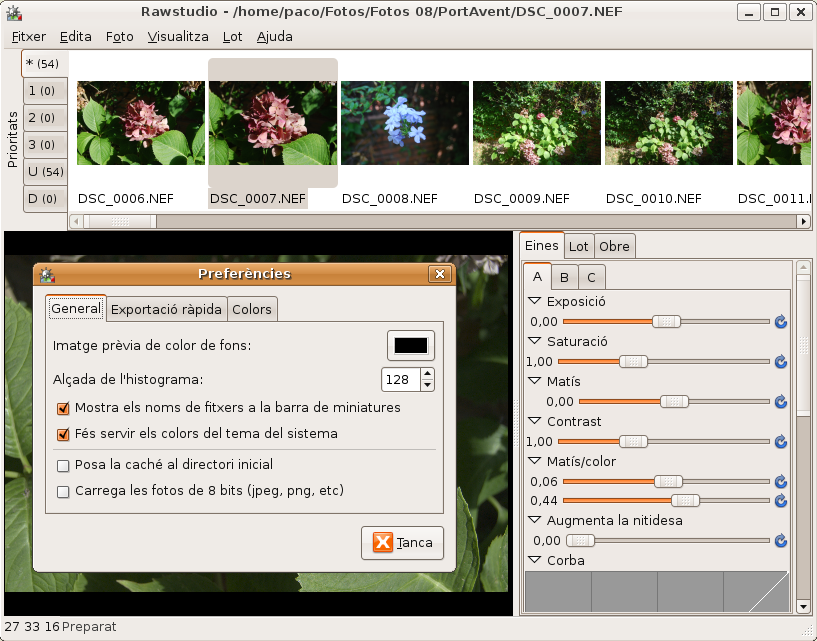
- Rawstudio 1.0
- Original authors: Anders Brander and Anders Kvist
- Initial release: June 22, 2006; 19 years ago
- Stable release: 2.0 / 14 April 2017
- Operating system: Linux, OS X
- Type: Post-production tool for photography
- License: GPL-2.0-or-later
- Website: rawstudio.org
- Repository: github.com/rawstudio/rawstudio

Rawstudio is a free and open source stand-alone application software to read and manipulate images in raw image formats from digital cameras. It is designed for working rapidly with a large volume of images, whereas similar tools are designed to work with one image at a time.

Rawstudio reads raw images from all digital camera manufacturers using dcraw as a back end. supports color management using LittleCMS to allow the user to apply color profiles (see also Linux color management).

Rawstudio uses the GTK+ user interface toolkit.

Rawstudio was available in Debian through version 7 "Wheezy", but removed from the distribution due to the software's dependency on obsolete libraries.

== See also ==
- Darktable
- RawTherapee
- UFRaw
