= Helicon Filter =

Editing software for Microsoft Windows

- Helicon Filter 4.81 running on Windows XP
- Developer: Helicon Soft Ltd.
- Initial release: August 2004; 21 years ago
- Stable release: 5.2.4 / June 18, 2013; 12 years ago
- Operating system: Microsoft Windows
- Type: Raster graphics editor
- License: Proprietary, Freeware
- Website: www.heliconsoft.com/heliconfilter.html

Helicon Filter, also referred to as Helicon, Filter, or as HF, was a proprietary commercial and shareware photo editing software program for Microsoft Windows, similar to such programs as Adobe Photoshop and GIMP, developed and published by Helicon Soft Ltd. Unlike these other programs, Helicon Filter is designed primarily to edit and improve existing photos and not for graphics creation. Helicon Filter's interface also differs from other programs in that compact toolbars and menus containing editing tools are replaced with labeled "filter" tabs, each tab containing labeled edit options specific to a single aspect of the picture. Although some editors used to Photoshop-style programs may initially find this layout unfamiliar and unlike the standard toolbar layout, beginners and those who don't recognize the standard icons generally find this very helpful for getting through the editing process.

== Overview ==
Helicon Filter, formally Helicon NoiseFilter, was introduced in August, 2004 as Helicon Filter 1.61, by Helicon Soft, Ltd., a company based in Kharkiv, Ukraine. By 2005, Helicon Filter had become known for its noise reduction ability, though it also had some other basic features such as raw support, exposure correction, color adjustments, red eye removal, and resizing/cropping. More recent versions of the program have yielded more advanced features also found in Photoshop CS including cloning, selective color editing, and HDR imaging, though Helicon Filter still lacks other features found in Photoshop such as layer support, full selective editing abilities, and the ability to create graphics. The program runs in English, Russian, German, French, Spanish, Dutch and Italian.

== Functionalities ==
=== Live preview ===
An "edit map" indicating (in pink) which areas of the picture will be affected by a specific filter. In this example, "Noise map" is used to show where noise reduction will be applied.

Helicon Filter's live preview can be used in either simple mode (commercial and freeware versions) or expert mode (commercial versions only). Simple mode allows the user to control aspects of the picture with fewer sliders, fewer brushes, no equalizers and no Aberrations filter, while expert mode gives the user more sliders along with equalizer control. Live preview can be used to show the final image after editing, can show a split between the edited version and the original, and can show images as a full-screen preview. Right-clicking causes the image preview to temporarily be replaced with the original version. A slider exists to select custom zoom, and in most filter tabs, a magnifying class can be used to view portions of a picture at higher magnification. In some filters, an "edit map" can be used to view which areas which will be affected from those filters. There is also a filter-guide wizard to help in going through a workflow of the different filter tabs.

=== Plugins ===
Helicon Filter is designed to support plugins which would work with Photoshop (i.e., they are in the 8BF file format), however many of these plugins do not properly function in Helicon Filter and other programs which claim their support.

=== Image stacking ===
In Helicon Filter Home and Pro, one is able to stack several images of the same subject where the pictures are of the same dimensions. The program does not implement layers for customized stacking, rather the program has built in stacking for specific uses. Firstly, High dynamic range images (HDR) can be created using the Increase dynamic range command. Secondly, the program is able to stack several images with high noise levels into one low-noise picture. Finally, the program is partially capable of stacking images of a moving subject together to create effects of time-lapse or multi-exposure photography to capture such things as moving stars, however Helicon Filter cannot spread out the frames to amplify a subject's motion (e.g. landing bird, flipping gymnast) or create GIF movies from these images.

=== Noise reduction ===
Image noise and grain can be controlled in the Noise filter using the Noise level, Highlights, Shadows, Radius and Chroma sliders. These sliders allow for selective noise reduction by object detail and brightness. Noise reduction can be applied to specific colors in expert preview mode using an equalizer. In this filter, there is also a dust and hot/dead pixel map feature which, based on a special photograph, allows the user to define certain areas in the picture which would have dust and dead pixels for the program to remove.

=== Brightness ===
The exposure and lighting of a photograph can be improved using the Contrast, Gamma, Exposure, Local contrast, Highlights, Shadows, Black point, and White point sliders. An equalizer to control effect by exposure (with a zone slider for tone mapping), along with Haze compensation and gradient haze compensation sliders, appear in expert preview mode.

=== Colors ===
In the Colors filter, an image's white balance can be adjusted through color sliders or by selecting an area of the picture that should be white or match a predefined "memory color". Equalizers control spectral sensitivity and saturation by color. The brightness, hue and saturation of a color range can also be modified in a process often referred to as color swapping.

=== Aberration Removal ===
In expert preview mode, chromatic aberrations can be removed in the Aberration filter by selecting an aberration color and adjusting the Radius, Brightness threshold, and Color tolerance sliders. There is also a tool to reduce lateral aberrations. This filter works by taking all areas in a picture with the defined aberration color and reducing its saturation to zero. Since purple fringing, a common aberration type, is easiest to remove, purple is by default the aberration removal color. Optical aberrations, such as red/cyan fringing, are more difficult to remove and often must be cloned out in order to remove them completely.

=== Sharpening ===
In the Sharpening filter, sliders allow for the sharpening of both small details and edges. In expert preview mode, an equalizer can be used to sharpen specific colors and leave others unchanged. White halos can also be suppressed when sharpening.

=== Distortions ===
In the Distortions filter, barrel or pincushion distortion can be controlled, horizontal and vertical perspective may be changed, the image may be stretched and squeezed, the image may be skewed, h-bend can be controlled, and vignetting can be corrected. This feature is especially useful for photographs taken with a wide-angle lens, as this often produces distorted images. Complete image flips and rotations of varying degrees may also be done.

=== Resizing ===
Helicon Filter allows for cropping and resizing of an image. The image may be sized by custom pixels, pre-defined print sizes and DPI, special cropping for mobile devices or for the web, or as a percentage of the original image size.

=== Frames ===
Frames and text can be added to an image using the Frames tab. Frames and text can also be positioned in various parts of the photo and rotated. The frames can be colored as a function of the actual image or as a solid color, a few frame effects are available (Shadow, 3D frame, Smoothed 3D, Fade out, Oval, Background highlighting, and Background shadow), and the size of frames can be controlled. Text may also be inserted in this filter. The text's font and size can be controlled, and, as with the frames, can be colored as a function of the photograph or as a solid color. One is also able to control the texture and transparency of this text.

=== Retouching ===
In the Retouching tab, brushes can be selected to perform such tasks as removal of imperfections, cloning, brightness correction, color alteration, saturation alteration, focus correction, noise reduction, red-eye removal, distorting, and replacing of a background or subject. A brush also exists to erase either changes of other brushes or all effects from all filters. The Delete scratches, Reduce noise, Distort, and Replace sky/background brushes are only available in expert preview mode. The brushes' size, softness, intensity and edge sensitivity can be controlled. All strokes performed in this tab may be undone.

=== File support ===
Helicon Filter supports the most common raster graphic file formats, such as JPEG, GIF (import only), and PNG, as well as some less common formats, such as the most recent raw formats, JPEG 2000, Photoshop images (PSD), and both 16 and 8 bit TIFFs. Movie files may be played back, though they may not be edited. In the free version, files may only be saved as jpegs and bitmaps. As a security means in certain licenses to prevent extended license periods, photos dated later than the date of the computer do not open, and this has caused some complaints from those who have mis-dated pictures.

=== File control ===
Individual photos can be tagged with speech or text notes. Files may be saved as Bitmap, JPEG, JPEG Progressive, JPEG 2000, PSD, PNG, TIFF, and TIFF LZW files. When saving files as JPEGs, the user can select the JPEG quality and calculate the files size. Processing of raw images is done with either dcraw or Helicon's older raw conversion process, from Polybytes. Files can also be printed within Helicon Filter, emailed, or sent to mobile phones. Complete Exif can be viewed as a separate window within Helicon Filter.

=== Call from photo programs ===
Helicon Filter may be opened from Helicon Focus and Helicon Photo Safe, as well as other programs which make use of context menus (such as Windows Explorer and Picasa). If used with a Pro license, Helicon Filter may also be opened within certain photo programs, including Photoshop, Corel PHOTO-PAINT, and Corel Paint Shop Pro, as an 8BF plugin.

=== Gallery ===
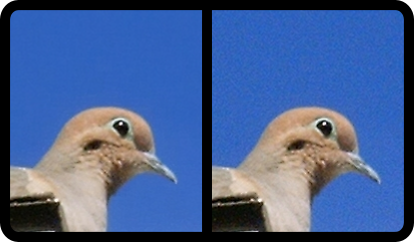
Noise reduction in Helicon Filter. The original is the one on the right.

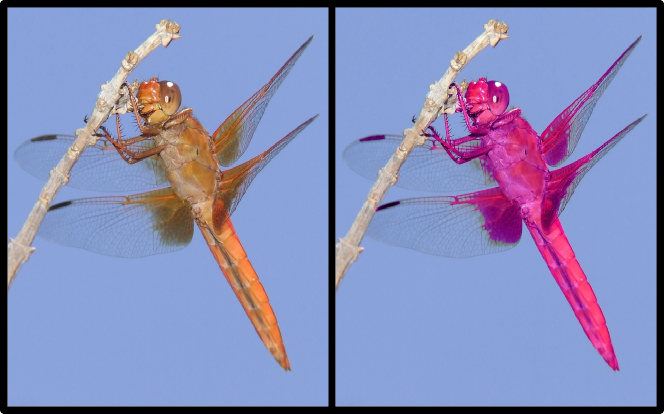
"Color swapping" (of a skimmer dragonfly) using the Colors filter. The original is the one on the left.

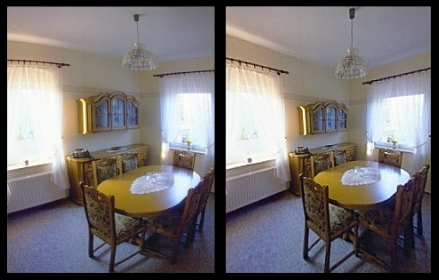
An example of barrel distortion compensation of a 15 mm fisheye lens using the Distortions filter. The original is the one on the left.

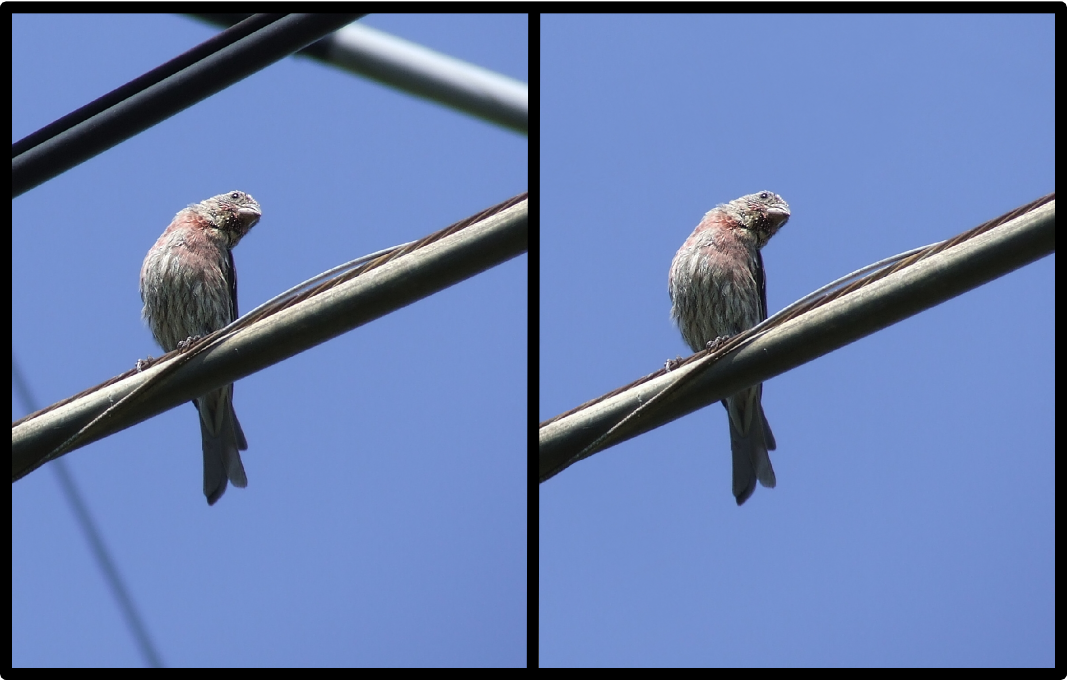
Removal of unwanted elements (around a house finch) using the Delete scratches and Clone brushes. The original is the one on the left.

== Compared to Photoshop ==
Adobe Photoshop is one of the most well-known programs for commercial bitmap and image manipulation. It is designed to allow the user a wide range of control over image manipulation and features a wide range of functions and controls. Helicon Filter, on the other hand, is designed for less experienced users while still providing advanced tools needed to improve already existing photographs; menus and toolbars containing edit options are replaced with "filter" tabs, each tab containing labeled edit options. Due to this simplification, Helicon Filter is unable to perform Photoshop's abilities of advanced layer manipulation and graphic creation, and Helicon does not have full selection editing abilities.

An element of Photoshop necessary for advanced image manipulation is use of layers and alpha channel support. Layers allow the user to edit elements of an image individually and to move elements or objects from one image to another. Helicon Filter does not support layers, however two common functions of layers — adding a subject or background from one photograph to another and adding text and frames — can still be performed in Helicon. Using the brushes, one object from an image can be neatly painted into another. Text and frames can also be put into an image using the Frames filter. Even with these workarounds, however, Helicon Filter, due to its lack of layer support, can not do some things that Photoshop can. For example, an object painted in from another picture can not later be moved to a different location in the new picture. (Helicon Soft has mentioned plans to implement layers in upcoming versions.)

Another important element of Photoshop, the acceptance of third-party plugins, is useful in image correction. Plugins are needed to create many effects for an image such as color manipulation, insertion of ripples and other effects, and noise reduction. Although Helicon Filter supports many of these 8BF plugins, they are generally not needed due to the program's built-in features such as noise reduction, aberration removal, perspective adjustment, and so on.

Both Helicon Filter and Adobe Photoshop are able to blend and combine images in several different ways, most notably as multi-exposures and HDRs. One image blend type Photoshop is capable of while Helicon Filter is not is that of panoramic photography. However, Helicon Filter is able to stack several images for noise reduction, while Photoshop is not.

Some features of Helicon Filter which are not found in Photoshop and which contribute to the program's ease of use are its Erase changes brush, its ability to edit, change and undo various aspects of a photo independently, and its edit mapping ability which indicates which areas of a photo will be affected by an edit.

Aside from those differences, both programs share almost all practical functionality for image improvement. For example, both programs are able to retouch images, sharpen them, modify colors, remove red eye, remove aberrations, compensate for lens distortion, and perform many similar functions. Both programs are also able to open and save images from a wide range of formats including the latest raw formats, PNG and JPEG 2000.

== See also ==
- Raster graphics editor
- Comparison of raster graphics editors
- Image editing
- Helicon Focus
