= LightZone =

Free digital darkroom software

LightZone, Inc.

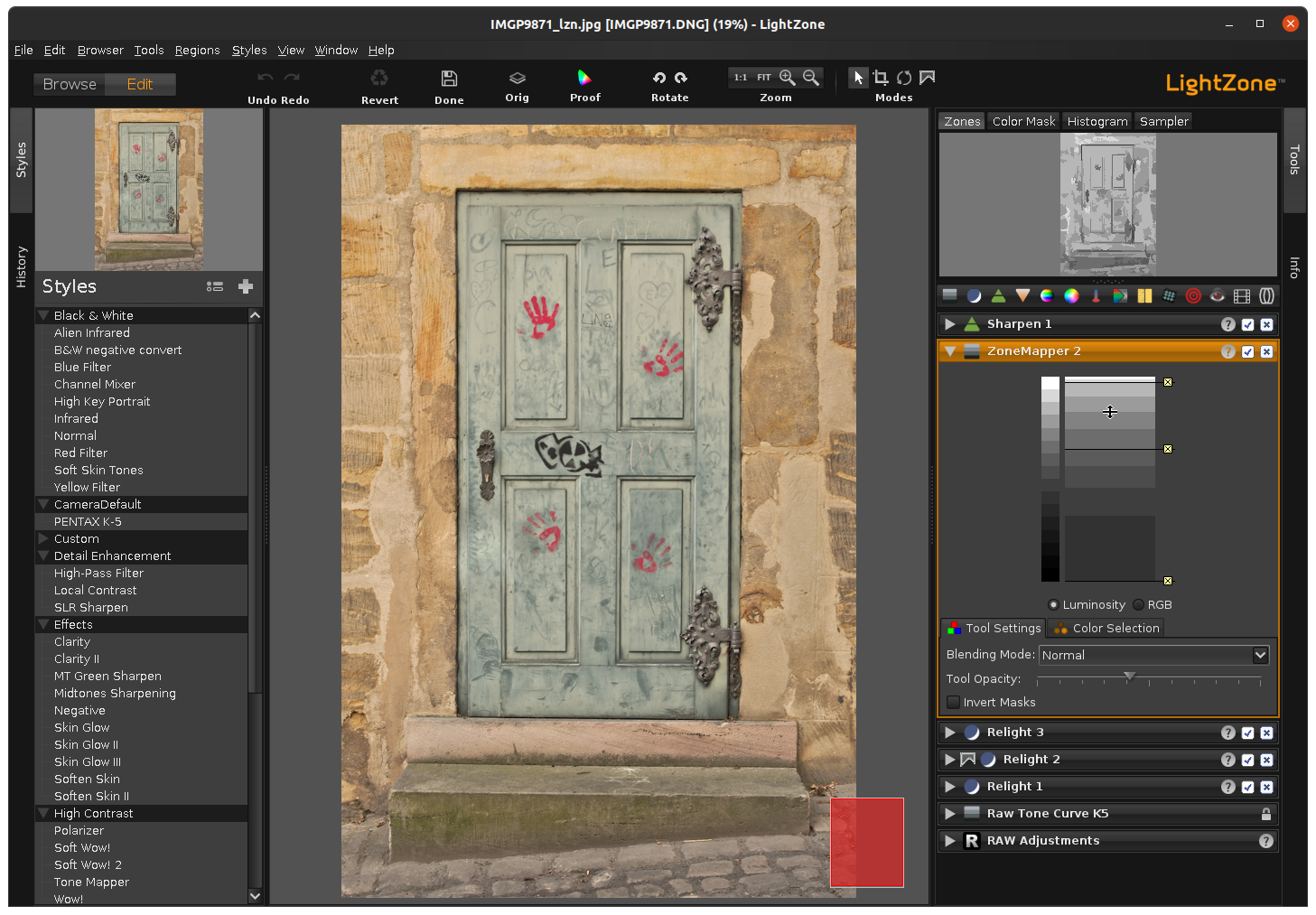
- LightZone 4.2.2 under Ubuntu Linux
- Original author: Light Crafts
- Developers: Community, Anton Kast
- Stable release: 4.2.5 / 6 January 2023; 26 September 2023;
- Repository: github.com/ktgw0316/LightZone
- Written in: Java (programming language)
- Operating system: FreeBSD, Linux, Mac OS X and Windows
- Platform: Java
- Type: Photo post-production
- License: 2012: BSD-3-Clause; 2005: Proprietary
- Website: lightzoneproject.org at the Wayback Machine (archived January 24, 2022)

LightZone is a free, open-source digital photo editor software application. It was originally developed as commercial software by the now-defunct Light Crafts. Its main purpose is to handle the workflow, including non-destructive editing when handling images in various RAW formats. LightZone outputs JPEG files which contain metadata references to the original image file location and a record of the transformations applied during editing. It is comparable to Adobe Lightroom.

== History ==
Versions for Windows, Mac OS X and Linux were available commercially. Although the Linux version was free of charge in earlier versions, its price was adapted with the 3.5 release.

In mid-September, 2011, the Light Crafts website went offline without notice. It was reported that Fabio Riccardi, founder of Light Crafts and the primary developer of LightZone, was now working as an Apple employee, as evidenced by his LinkedIn profile. The final version from Light Crafts was version 3.9, except for Mac OS X which had a bug-fix version 3.9.2. Ongoing LightZone support, including updates to let LightZone process Raw files from new camera models, was being provided by the volunteer LightZombie Project.

On 22 December 2012, the LightZombie domain was redirected to the new LightZoneProject.org site, and an announcement was made by Anton Kast (one of the original authors of LightZone) that they had negotiated to release the original LightZone source as free software. This was hosted at https://github.com/AntonKast/LightZone (later moved to https://github.com/ktgw0316/LightZone).

In June 2013, new packages of LightZone were released for Linux, Mac OSX, and Microsoft Windows platforms. While effectively identical in terms of features to the previous proprietary version (v3.9.x) this release was cast as v4.0.0 to distinguish it as the first under the free BSD-3-Clause license.

== Features ==
LightZone edits both RAW and JPEG format images. LightZone can create and apply pre-determined image transformations, called "styles", to an entire batch of images in a single operation. Using styles, photographers make and save their own preferred compensations for each RAW image based upon camera specific characteristics. Once created, a style is easily applied to multiple images, allowing those standard camera compensations to be applied to every image before the photographer ever views or edits it.

LightZone is a non-destructive RAW editor. It treats the digital image original (typically a RAW file) as precious and non-editable. When LightZone edits an original digital image, a new resulting post-edit image file is created (for example a new JPEG copy) and the original image file is left unaltered. By being non-destructive LightZone preserves the original "digital negative" which contains the maximum information originally captured by the camera, and allows additional images with different transformations to be produced from the original.

LightZone outputs JPEG files which contain metadata references to the original image file location and a record of the transformations applied during editing.

Because the JPEG output files that LightZone creates contain the entire transformation history, edits can always be undone in a new edit session, long after they were saved. Indeed, the same transformations can be easily reordered, and additional transformations applied subsequently to yield further image improvements. Additionally, since transformations always begin with the original RAW image rather than an intermediate JPEG version, JPEG compression-related editing artifacts are avoided.

== Awards ==
On December 19, 2007, LightZone was awarded a MacWorld's 23rd Annual Editors' Choice Award.

== See also ==
- List of free and open source software packages
