= Silkypix Developer Studio =

- Developer(s): Ichikawa Soft Laboratory Co. Ltd
- Stable release: 10.0.11.0 / February 4, 2021; 4 years ago
- Operating system: Microsoft Windows, OS X
- Type: Photo post-production
- License: Proprietary
- Website: silkypix.isl.co.jp/en/

Silkypix Developer Studio is commercial and proprietary raw image processing software. It is often bundled with cameras from manufacturers such as Fujifilm, Panasonic and Pentax.
