= LibRaw =

Open-source software library for reading RAW images

- Developer(s): Iliah Borg, Alex Tutubalin
- Stable release: 0.21.4 / 13 April 2025; 3 months ago
- Repository: github.com/LibRaw/LibRaw
- Written in: C++
- Operating system: Windows, macOS, Linux, FreeBSD
- License: GNU LGPL 2.1
- Website: www.libraw.org

LibRaw is a free and open-source software library for reading raw files from digital cameras. It supports virtually all raw formats. It is based on the source code of dcraw, with modifications, and "is intended for embedding in raw converters, data analyzers, and other programs using raw files as the initial data."

LibRaw is available for Windows, macOS, Linux and FreeBSD. It is included in many Linux distributions such as Arch Linux, Debian, Fedora, Gentoo Linux, openSUSE, Slackware and Ubuntu.

== See also ==
- Camera Image File Format
- DevIL
- Digital Negative
- List of cameras supporting a raw format
- ORF format
