= Dcraw =

Open-source computer program

dcraw
- Original author: Dave Coffin
- Release: 23 February 1997; 29 years ago
- Stable release: 9.28 (1 June 2018; 8 years ago) [±]
- Written in: ANSI C
- Operating system: Cross-platform
- Platform: Platform independent
- Available in: English and 11 others
- Type: raw decoding software
- License: GPLv2+
- Website: dechifro.org/dcraw/

dcraw is an open-source computer program which is able to read numerous raw image format files, typically produced by mid-range and high-end digital cameras. dcraw converts these images into the standard TIFF and PPM image formats. This conversion is sometimes referred to as developing a raw image (by analogy with the process of film development) since it renders raw image sensor data (a "digital negative") into a viewable form.

A number of other image processing programs use dcraw internally to enable them to read raw files.

Development of dcraw began on February 23, 1997. Version 1.0 was released in revision 1.18, on May 5, 2000. Versions up to 3.15 used the name Canon PowerShot Converter, starting with v3.40 the name was Raw Photo Decoder, switching to Raw Photo Decoder "dcraw" in v5.70. Version 8.86 supported 300 cameras.

The development has stalled, with only two releases since May 2015 and the last release dated June 2018, but parts of dcraw are included in LibRaw.

== Motivation ==
While most camera manufacturers supply raw image decoding software for their cameras, this software is almost always proprietary, and often becomes unsupported when a camera model is discontinued. The file formats themselves are often undocumented, and several manufacturers have gone so far as to encrypt all or part of the data in their raw image format, in an attempt to prevent third-party software from accessing it.

Given this ever-expanding plethora of raw image formats, and uncertain and inconsistent support for them by the manufacturers, many photographers worry that their valuable raw images may become unreadable as the applications and operating systems required become obsolete.

In contrast to proprietary decoding software, dcraw strives for simplicity, portability, and consistency, as expressed by its author:

So here is my mission: Write and maintain an ANSI C program that decodes any raw image from any digital camera on any computer running any operating system.

== Design ==
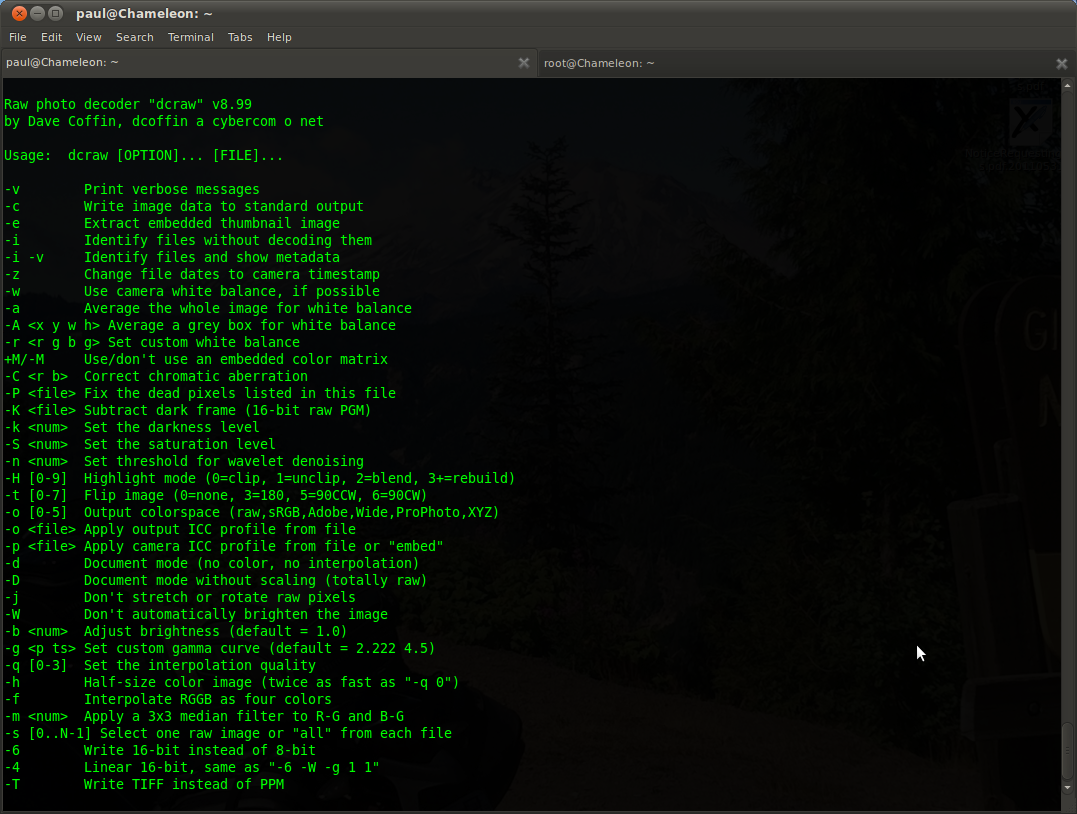
Screenshot of dcraw v. 8.99

Because many raw image formats are specific to one make or model of camera, dcraw is frequently updated to support new models. For many proprietary raw image formats, dcraw's source code (based largely on reverse-engineering) is the best—or only—publicly available documentation. dcraw currently supports the raw formats of several hundred cameras.

dcraw is built around the Unix philosophy. The program is a command line tool which takes a list of raw image files to process, along with any image adjustment options desired. dcraw also serves as the basis for various high-level raw image-processing applications (such as viewers and converters), both free and open source software as well as proprietary software.

== GUI front-ends ==
Several GUI front-ends for dcraw are available. These applications use dcraw as a back-end to do the actual processing of raw images, but present a graphical interface with which the image processing options can be adjusted.

- AZImage – image converter (uses LibRaw rather than dcraw) for Windows
- darktable – a standalone raw developer for Windows, Linux, and macOS
- dcraw-assist – for Linux
- dcRAW-X – for macOS
- digiKam – for Linux
- DNG Viewer by ideaMK – raw image viewer for Windows
- EasyHDR – for Windows
- gimp-dcraw – GIMP plug-in for Windows, Linux, and macOS
- Helicon Filter – photo editor, can use dcraw for raw processing for Windows
- Konvertor – for Windows
- nUFRaw – a standalone raw developer, a new version of UFRaw for Linux
- Phiewer – for macOS
- RAWDrop – for Windows
- Rawstudio – a standalone raw developer for Linux
- SilkRaw – exports embedded thumbnails and launch batch conversion for Amiga OS4, AROS, and MorphOS
- SNS-HDR – for Windows
- UFRaw – a standalone raw developer and GIMP plug-in for Windows, Linux, and macOS
- Mass Image Compressor – Bulk image compressor for Windows, uses dcraw to read and convert the images to JPEG.
