= PhotoLine =

Raster and vector graphics editor

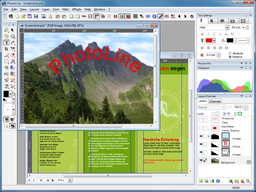
- PhotoLine running on Windows 7
- Developer: Computerinsel GmbH
- Release: January 1996; 30 years ago
- Stable release: 25.0 / January 23, 2025; 19 months ago
- Written in: C++
- Operating system: macOS, Microsoft Windows
- Platform: x86, x64, ARM, PowerPC
- Available in: 5 languages
- List of languages American English, German, Mandarin Chinese, French, Italian
- Type: Raster graphics editor, vector graphics editor
- License: Proprietary, Shareware
- Website: www.pl32.com

PhotoLine is a graphics editor developed and published by Computerinsel GmbH for Windows and macOS.

It was originally created in 1995 by Gerhard Huber and Martin Huber and was first released in 1996 for the Atari ST line of personal computers.

== Features ==
PhotoLine supports multi-layer raster and vector documents. It provides tools for masking, alpha compositing, layer blending, color management, image adjustment, filtering, and transformations.

In Addition to raster and vector editing, PhotoLine can be used for small desktop publishing projects. Multi-page documents with page spreads and text flow between text frames and pages are supported. Character and paragraph styles can be defined. Spot colors, bleed settings, a baseline grid, a table of contents generator, and PDF/X support help with these projects. PhotoLine is however much more limited when compared to dedicated publishing software such as Adobe InDesign or QuarkXPress.

PhotoLine incorporates the LibRaw library to read raw images from digital cameras for import. PhotoLine can open raw files as linear unmodified and non color managed source images. Photoshop PSD files can be imported and exported.

PhotoLine can be extended through standard Photoshop-compatible plugins, G'MIC digital image processing framework, and PSP tubes. Custom functionality is further supported through scripting and macro recording.

== Early history ==
Developed by two brothers, Gerhard Huber and Martin Huber, PhotoLine was first released in January 1996 on the Atari ST line of personal computers from Atari Corporation.

Previously, Gerhard and Martin had worked on making graphics cards for Atari computers and writing drivers for image scanners. Atari's market share was declining, and the brothers considered developing a video game to expand the business. This led them to search for image editing software that would run on Atari computers and fit their game project. Only an image editor called tms Cranach came close to what Gerhard and Martin had in mind. tms Cranach was a Raster graphics editor running on Atari's MegaST/STe, TT030, and Falcon030 systems. However, Cranach turned out to be expensive software and complicated to use. The brothers contacted tms (Cranach's developers) and this resulted in an offer from tms to purchase Cranach and its source code, as tms intended to exit the Atari software market. After the purchase of Cranach and its source code Gerhard and Martin initially continued to sell Cranach, but sales were low.

In 1995 the two decided to start developing a new graphics editor called "PhotoLine". PhotoLine was developed from scratch and written in C++. It nevertheless contained a lot of know-how from Cranach (which was written in C). PhotoLine first release was launched one year later in 1996.

With the growing popularity of Microsoft Windows, the release of Windows 95, and the limiting graphics hardware on the Atari platforms, the developers switched development platforms and continued development of PhotoLine for Windows only. The first Windows version (PhotoLine 2.2) was released in the middle of 1997. Shortly after, the Atari version was discontinued and saw its final release as PhotoLine 2.30. The Huber brothers released this final Atari version into the public domain in 2012.

The first Classic Mac OS version of PhotoLine 6 appeared in 1999 after many ex-Atari users who had switched to Mac OS pressured the PhotoLine developers to release an Apple port.

== Linux Support ==
PhotoLine runs natively under Windows and MacOS. While a native Linux version of PhotoLine is not available, running PhotoLine under Wine is actively supported and maintained by the developers. Running PhotoLine under Linux/Wine PhotoLine enables the user to allow Little CMS to fully support color management under Linux instead of the native OS CMS.

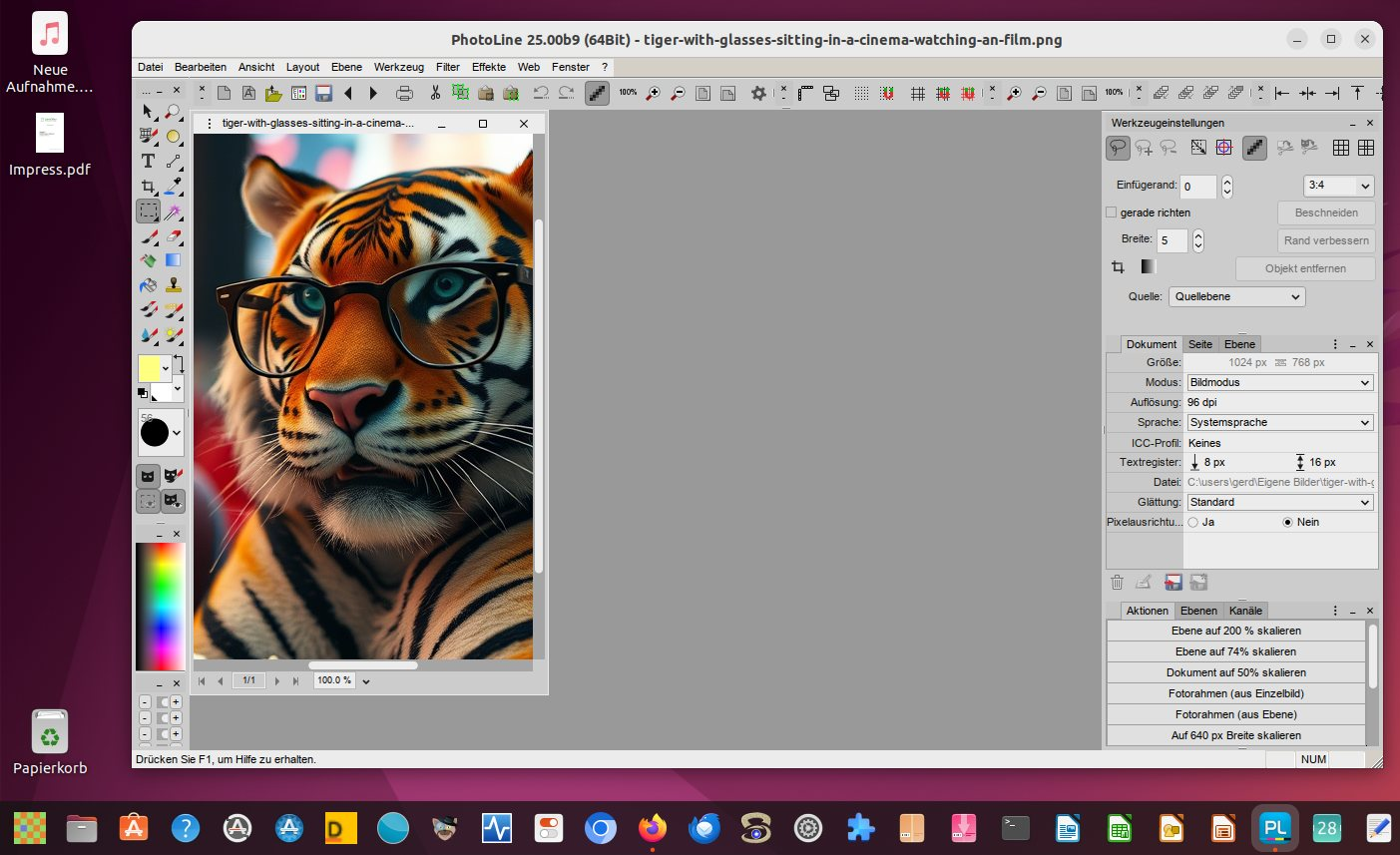
PhotoLine with Ubuntu (WINE)

== File format ==
Native PhotoLine files have the extension .PLD, which is an abbreviation of "PhotoLine Document". It can contain embedded JPEG, PNG, or camera raw images. It contains a preview image in JPEG or PNG format, which is used by the operating system or third-party applications to display a thumbnail of its contents. Thumbnails are natively supported on MacOS X.

During installation on Windows the user is presented with an option to install a PLD thumbnail preview driver which enables thumbnails of PLD content in Windows Explorer. Alternatively, the FastPictureViewer Standalone Codec Pack provides the ability to display PLD thumbnails in Windows Explorer.

== Version History ==
PhotoLine was first developed for the Atari ST computer. Version 2 was the first version for Windows, and since version 6 PhotoLine is also available for MacOS.

Version	Release date	Significant changes
1	January 1996	classic image editor for Atari ST without layers
2	July 1997	first Windows version (for Windows 95 and Windows NT 4.0); alpha channels; layer support; multiple undo
3	January 1998	vector layers; morphing tool; additional import and export formats
4	July 1998	macro recording; batch conversion
4.5	November 1998	full pattern support extending also to vector layers
5	February 1999	text layers and typographic support
6	Oct 1999	poster and label printing; virtual scaling and rotating; first version for Mac OS 8.5
7	2000	ICC Profiles; perspective distortion
8	2001/02	PDF handling; calendar creator; slideshow
9	Fall 2002	web export; clipping layers; line patterns; nondestructive layer distortions
10	Fall 2003	working layers (now called adjustment layers); support images with 16 bits of color depth; imports camera raw image files; CMYK color separation by ICC Profiles; text flow inside and around objects and between text layers; undo history
11	Oct 19, 2004	Dynamic animations using the Flash format; Radial blur; PDF export; Barcode generation; advanced layer effects; path text
12	Sep 19, 2005	various filters for digital images (white point, chromatic aberration, noise, color temperature); creation of HDR images; CIE Lab color space; simple 3D bodies
13	Sep 29, 2006	multiprocessor support; USB stick mode; text styles; repair brush; spell checker (on Mac OS X native / Windows Aspell)
14	Nov 9, 2007	improved creation of HDR images; crop tool; brush editor; handling of IPTC-data; gray mixer
15	Jan 15, 2009	support for 64 bit processors; editing of color bends; red eye removal tool; ray tool; harmonic colors; variable blur tool; SVG Import
16	April 21, 2010	adjustment layer panel; liquify tool for image distortion; vector morphing; color filters; QR-code
17	Dec 13, 2011	Remove object function; Remove Brush; New and enhanced quick masking (selection) and border matting tools; Image extraction tool; Content aware scaling; Copy without Colored Edge function; Selective color correction; Threshold filter and adjustment layer; Simple Browse: a mini version of the full image browser window
17.5	Dec 13, 2011	OpenEXR import and export; SVG extended import and export; OpenType features support on Mac OS X; Improved 32bit float and HDR support; Non-destructive bitmap gradients; Advanced layer blending: Color Filter; Curve Editor: work with additional color modes; Chromatic Aberration filter; New Curve Creation drawing tool; Web Export dialog: previews; Harmony: color scheme creation tool improvements
18	Oct 4, 2013	Distort tool; Straighten tool; Improved and expanded brush settings; New Hue Editor tool; Vector layer Booleans: union, intersection, difference and exclusion (XOR); Vector layers and gradients support full 32 bit (float) color depth; Live roundtripping interaction with external programs; Adjustable user interface color; Dockable panel tabs; Multiple window views of the same document; Automatic guides for easy positioning of elements; WebP import and export; PLD file sidecar save option (Seamlessly edit and save file formats such as JPEG and PNG without information loss)
19	May 25, 2015	Dehaze; Wipe Effects; Color To Transparency; Document Color List; Spot color / Tint Color; Enhanced Line Styles; Placeholder Layers (similar to Smart Objects in Photoshop); Support PDF/X1a and PDF/X3; Overprint
19.5	Mar 11, 2016	Align to Pixels: layers conform to the pixel grid; PSD import: Smart Objects convert to placeholder layers; APNG support (animated PNG files); Exif color space support; Various user interface improvements: document list tabs, scalable modal curve editor window
20	Nov 26, 2016	Dynamic Filters: non-destructive adjustment and filters for placeholder layers; Dynamic Filter support for external Photoshop compatible plugins; Match Color filter; Color Lookup filter; Context Blur filter; Vector graphic support for patterns; New geometric pattern arrangements: grid, horizontal bricks, vertical bricks; New pattern view mode; New PDF proofing display mode; Onscreen widgets for patterns and textures control; Improved placeholder layer functionality and workflow; Gradients: Cubic interpolation, repeat and mirroring for linear and circular gradients, transform elliptical gradients; Align to corner line pattern options; New layer search option; New layer content lock editing protection option; Spell checking: native support Windows 10; Convert PSD Smart Objects to placeholder layers; Option to assign colors and spot colors to 1bit images with transparency support
21	July 11, 2018	Scripting support; VBScript Windows; AppleScript macOS; Page spread support; Editable colors in vector patterns; Selection tools support for placeholder, vector, and text layers; New Camera Lens Correction function; Auto Save option; Improved font substitution workflow; Multiple layer support for transformations; PDF bleed display option; Grid option for layer edit tool; Smart curve anchor point removal option (to maintain the original curve shape)
22	Feb 28, 2020	Multichannel image support: assign multiple process and/or spot colors to a greyscale image with custom tone curves; New Transform Vector Points tool; Table of contents generator for documents; Pixel grid display option; Path groups with Boolean options; Channel mask option for layers: precise control over each color channel that affects layer compositing; improved vector editing tool options; Vibrance filter; HaldCLUTs support in Color Lookup; Document Attributes panel: change anti-aliasing and image interpolation settings for the entire document; JPEG 2000 import and export; PDF import and export: multichannel images (DeviceN) support
23	Nov 25, 2021	Mesh Gradients; Focus stacking; Photo Stitching (to create panoramas, for example); New Animate panel to create or edit classic image-based animations.; Improved vector layer clipping: clipping based on path, path shape, and layer luminance; PDF/X-4, PDF/A-1b and PDFA-2u export; Load and save animations in APNG and WebP formats; FITS and SER import; Minimum round filter; Curve editor improvements
24	June 30, 2023	New export options: assign one or more export settings to layers, layer groups and/or pages with precise control over export location, scaling, export format, and file suffix. Export all assets with one click.; Layer Compositions; Text editing: display formatting marks; User interface improvements: document windows look and usability; Improved layer search: search for a specific font; find virtual copies (layer clones).; Layer tool: selected bitmap areas can be moved or copied directly without the need to create duplicate layers; XCF import (GIMP file format); FITS and SER import; Many user interface and workflow improvements

== See also ==
- Comparison of raster graphics editors
