= Linux color management =

Controlled color representations on Linux operating system

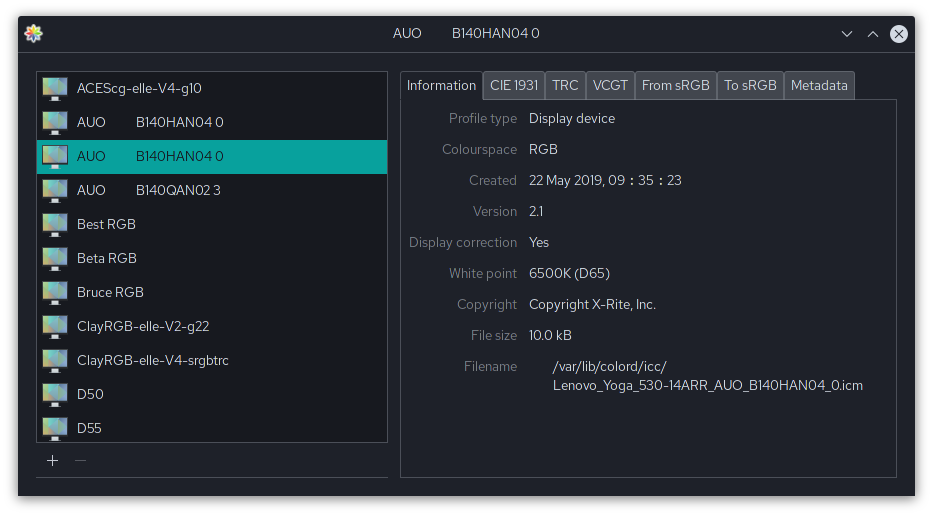
Color profile viewer on KDE Plasma 5, showing an ICC color profile

Linux color management has the same goal as the color management systems (CMS) for other operating systems, which is to achieve the best possible color reproduction throughout an imaging workflow from its source (camera, video, scanner, etc.), through imaging software (Digikam, darktable, RawTherapee, GIMP, Krita, Scribus, etc.), and finally onto an output medium (monitor, video projector, printer, etc.). In particular, color management attempts to enable color consistency across media and throughout a color-managed workflow.

Linux color management relies on the use of accurate ICC (International Color Consortium) and DCP (DNG Color Profile) profiles describing the behavior of input and output devices, and color-managed applications that are aware of these profiles. These applications perform gamut conversions between device profiles and color spaces. Gamut conversions, based on accurate device profiles, are the essence of color management.

Historically, color management was not an initial design consideration of the X Window System on which much of Linux graphics support rests, and thus color-managed workflows have been somewhat more challenging to implement on Linux than on other OS's such as Microsoft Windows or macOS. This situation is now being progressively remedied, and color management under Linux, while functional, has not yet acquired mature status. Although it is now possible to obtain a consistent color-managed workflow under Linux, certain problems still remain:

- The absence of a central user control panel for color settings.
- Some hardware devices for color calibration lack Linux drivers, firmware or accessory data.

Since ICC color profiles are written to an open specification, they are compatible across operating systems. Hence, a profile produced on one OS should work on any other OS given the availability of the necessary software to read it and perform the gamut conversions. This can be used as a workaround for the lack of support for certain spectrophotometers or colorimeters under Linux: one can simply produce a profile on a different OS and then use it in a Linux workflow. Additionally, certain hardware, such as most printers and certain monitors, can be calibrated under another OS and then used in a fully color-managed workflow on Linux.

The popular Ubuntu Linux distribution added initial color management in the 11.10 release (the "Oneiric Ocelot" release).

== Requirements for a color-managed workflow ==
- Accurate device profiles obtained with source or output characterization software.
- Correctly loaded video card lookup tables (LUTs) (or monitor profiles that do not require LUT adjustments).
- Color-managed applications that are configured to use a correct monitor profile and input/output profiles, with support for control over the rendering intent and black point compensation.

Calibration and profiling requires:

- for input devices (scanner, camera, etc.) a color target which the profiling software will compare to the manufacturer-provided color values of the target.
- or for output devices (monitor, printer, etc.) a reading with a specific device (spectrophotometer, colorimeter or spectrocolorimeter) of the color patch values and comparing the measured values against the values originally sent for output.

=== Monitor calibration and profiling ===
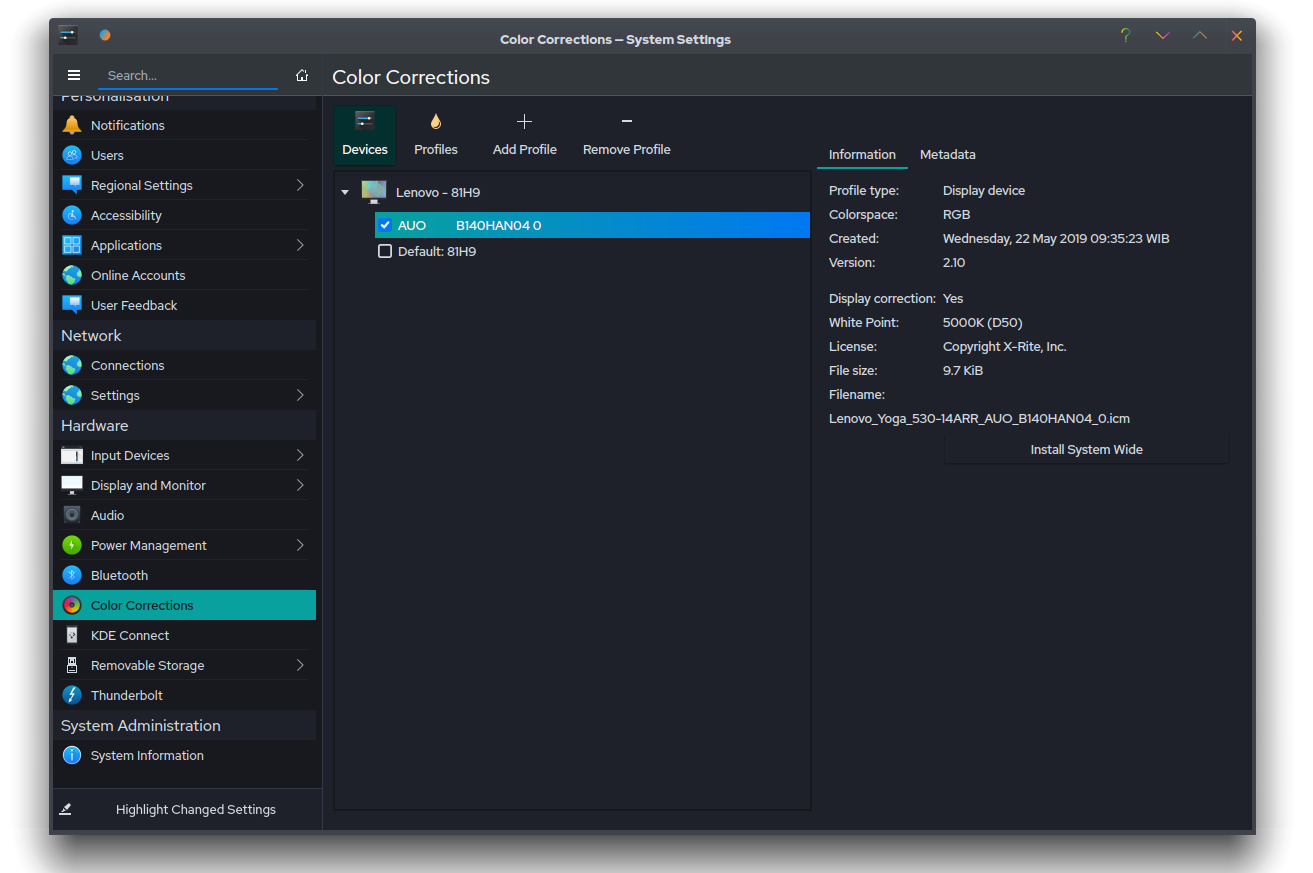
Color corrections settings panel on KDE Plasma 5

One of the critical elements in any color-managed workflow is the monitor, because, at one step or another, handling and making color adaptation through imaging software is required for most images, thus the ability of the monitor to present accurate colors is crucial.

Monitor color management consists of calibration and profiling.

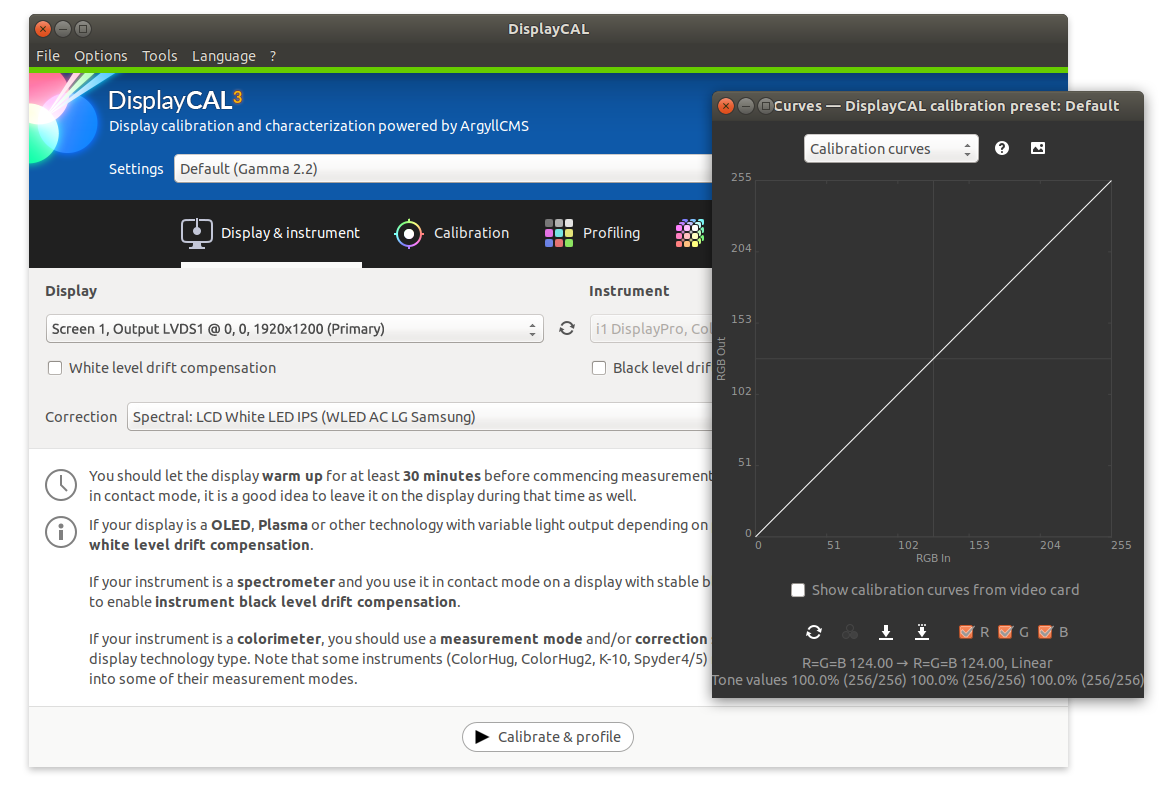
Calibration curve on DisplayCAL

The first step, calibration, is done by adjusting the monitor controls and the output of the graphics card (via calibration curves) to match user-definable characteristics, such as brightness, white point and gamma. The calibration settings are stored in a .cal file. The second step, profiling (characterization), involves measuring the calibrated display's response and recording it in a color profile. The profile is stored in an .icc file ("ICC file"). For convenience, the calibration settings are usually stored together with the profile in the ICC file.

Note that .icm files are identical to .icc files - the difference is only in the name.

Seeing correct colors requires using a monitor profile-aware application, together with the same calibration used when profiling the monitor. Calibration alone does not yield accurate colors. If a monitor was calibrated before it was profiled, the profile will only yield correct colors when used on the monitor with the same calibration (the same monitor control adjustments and the same calibration curves loaded into the video card's lookup table). macOS has built-in support for loading calibration curves and installing a system-wide color profile. Windows 7 onward allows loading calibration curves, though this functionality must be enabled manually. Linux and older versions of Windows require using a standalone LUT loader.

=== Device profiles ===
ICC profiles are cross-platform and can thus be created on other operating systems and used under Linux. Monitor profiles, however, require some additional attention. Since a monitor profile depends both on the monitor itself and on the video card, a monitor profile should only be used with the same monitor and video card with which it was created. The monitor settings should not be adjusted after creating the profile. In addition, since most calibration software use LUT adjustments during calibration, the corresponding LUTs must be loaded every time the display server (X11, Wayland) is started (e.g. with every graphical login).

In the unlikely case of a colorimeter being unsupported by Linux, a profile created under Windows or macOS can be used under Linux.

=== Display-channel lookup tables ===
There are two approaches to loading display channel LUTs:

1. Create a profile that does not modify video card LUTs and thus does not require LUTs be loaded later on. Ideally, this approach would rely on DDC-capable monitors—the internal monitor settings of which are set via calibration software. Unfortunately, monitors capable of making these adjustments through DDC are not common and are generally expensive. There is only one calibration software on Linux that can interact with a DDC monitor. For mainstream monitors, a couple of options exist:
  - BasICColor software, which works with most colorimeters on the market, allows one to adjust display output via the monitor interface, and then to choose a "Profile, do not calibrate" option. By doing this, one can create a profile that does not require video card LUT adjustments.
  - For EyeOne devices, EyeOne Match allows the user to calibrate to "Native" gamma and white point targets, which results in the LUT adjustment curves displayed after the calibration as a simple, linear 1:1 mapping (a straight line from corner to corner).
  - Both BasICColor and EyeOne Match do not presently run under Linux but they are capable of creating a profile that does not require LUT adjustments.
2. Use an LUT loader to actually load the LUT adjustments contained within the profile prepared during calibration. According to the documentation, these loaders do not modify the video card LUT by itself, but achieve the same type of adjustment by modifying the X server gamma ramp. Loaders are available for Linux distributions that use X.org or XFree86—the two most popular X servers on Linux. Other X servers are not guaranteed to work with the currently available loaders. There are two LUT loaders available for Linux:
  - Xcalib is one such loader, and although it is a command-line utility, it is quite easy to use.
  - dispwin is a part of Argyll CMS.
  - If, for any reason, the LUT cannot be loaded, it is still recommended to go through the initial stages of calibration where a user is asked by calibration software to make some manual adjustments to the monitor, as this will often improve display linearity and also provide information on its color temperature. This is especially recommended for CRT monitors.

=== Color-managed applications ===
In ICC-aware applications, it is important to make sure the correct profiles are assigned to devices, mainly to the monitor and the printer. Some Linux applications can auto-detect the monitor profile, while others requires that it is specified manually.

Although there is no designated place to store device profiles on Linux, /usr/share/color/icc/ has become the de facto standard.

Most applications running under WINE have not been fully tested for color accuracy. While 8-bpp programs can have some color resolution difficulties due to depth conversion errors, colors in higher-depth applications should be accurate, as long as those programs perform their gamut conversions based on the same monitor profile as that used for loading the LUT, granted that the corresponding LUT adjustments are loaded.

== List of color-managed applications ==
- darktable, a raw photo developer and GIMP plugin.
- digiKam, an image organizer and tag editor.
- Firefox, a web browser, color-managed since version 3, turned on by default since v3.5.
- GIMP, a raster graphics editor.
- Geeqie, an image viewer and image organizer.
- Krita and Karbon, an image editor and vector graphics editor, respectively (parts of Calligra Suite, a graphic art and office suite).
- LightZone, a raw photo developer.
- Opera, a web browser.
- RawTherapee, a raw photo developer and GIMP plugin.
- Scribus, a desktop publishing (DTP) application.
- Siril, an astronomical image processing program.
- UFRaw, a raw photo developer and GIMP plugin.

=== Obsolete ===
- CinePaint, an obsolete 16-bit-capable image editor.
- F-Spot, an obsolete image organizer.
- Bibble Pro, an obsolete raw digital imaging program. Sold to Corel, renamed to Aftershot Pro.
- Phatch, an obsolete raster graphics editor used to batch-process images.

== List of software for input and output profiling ==
- Argyll Color Management System (Argyll CMS) is an open-source command line only collection of tools. Argyll CMS covers a wide range of needs from source or output characterization to monitor LUT loading and more. Argyll CMS is available as a package in Ubuntu, Debian, openSUSE (Build Service) and Fedora and as a generic x86 Linux binary installation from the web site, along with source code under the GPL.
- DisplayCAL is an open-source display calibration and profiling solution with a GUI which uses ArgyllCMS at its core. It allows one to calibrate and characterize a display, generate ICC profiles with optional CIECAM02 gamut mappings and 3D LUTs, generate reports for ICC profiles, measure display device uniformity, create and edit test charts, and among other things even to create synthetic ICC profiles.
- DCamProf is an open-source command-line tool for generating ICC and DCP (DNG Color Profile) camera profiles from test target measurements or camera spectral sensitivity functions. Features include giving the user control over the matrix and LUT optimizers to hand-tune the trade-off between accuracy and smoothness, profile matching, generating reports for plotting, simulating reflective spectra, analyzing camera color separation performance under different illuminants, and flat-field correction of test-chart photos.

=== Obsolete ===
- LPROF (or LCMS Profiler) was a GUI tool for producing profiles for cameras, scanners and monitors. LPROF was originally designed to demonstrate LittleCMS (LCMS) capabilities. In 2005, LPROF development was resumed by a new team, which released the final version in 2006 when development was abandoned.

== List of LUT loaders ==
A color profile file for a monitor will typically contain two parts:

- The VCGT/LUT part, which does white point correction, and is applied to the screen as a whole.
- The gamma+matrix part, which does gamma/hue/saturation correction, and has to be applied by individual color-managed applications.

In a color-managed setup, the VCGT/LUT part is typically loaded on login, while the filename of the color profile is stored in the _ICC_PROFILE X atom so that color managed programs can load that as a default profile for applying gamma+matrix corrections. Some programs also let you override what profile is used for gamma+matrix corrections.

- dispwin, used to load both VCGT/LUT and _ICC_PROFILE atoms at once. Part of ArgyllCMS.
- xcalib, a tiny monitor calibration loader for XFree86 (or X.Org) and MS-Windows, which sets the monitor VCGT/LUT part of the color profile
- xiccd, a daemon that interacts with colord and sets the _ICC_PROFILE X atom to the path of your color profile, for program-specific gamma+matrix corrections. Note that GNOME and KDE already inform colord if you've set a profile in their settings, whereas XFCE has no built-in colord interaction.

== List of color management systems ==
=== colord ===
colord
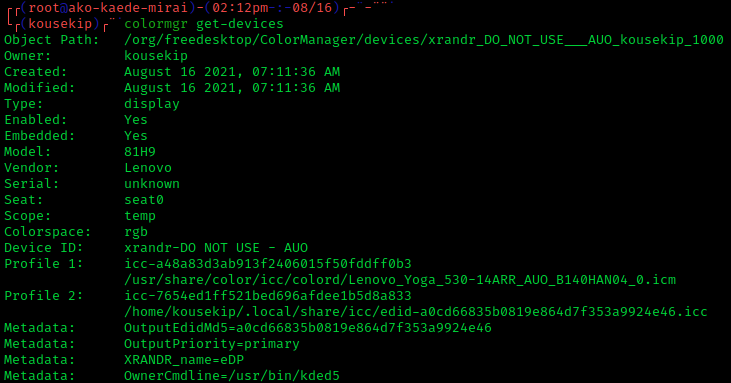
- colormgr, a part of colord that manages color-managed devices
- Developer: Richard Hughes et al.
- Stable release: 1.4.8 / June 23, 2025; 14 months ago
- Written in: C
- Operating system: Linux, FreeBSD
- Type: system daemon color management
- License: GPLv2+
- Website: www.freedesktop.org/software/colord/

colord is a system daemon that makes it easy to manage, install and generate color profiles to accurately color manage input and output devices.

colord provides a D-Bus API for system frameworks to query, offering the ability to, for example, get the profiles for a given device or create a device and assign to it a given profile. colord provides a persistent database-backed store that is preserved across reboots, and it provides the session for a way to set system settings, for instance setting the display profile for all users and all sessions.

GNOME Color Manager and colord-kde are graphical tools for colord to be used in the GNOME and KDE desktop environments. Each acts as a client to colord.

colord supports the following subsystems:

- XRandR (monitors)
- SANE (scanners)
- udev (cameras)
- CUPS (printers)

== See also ==
- International Color Consortium
