= ColorSync =

Software API

ColorSync is Apple's color management API for the Classic Mac OS and Mac OS X operating systems.

== Version history ==
Apple developed the original 1.0 version of ColorSync as a Mac-only architecture, which made it into an operating system release in 1993. In the same year, Apple co-founded the International Color Consortium (ICC) to develop a cross-platform profile format which became part of ColorSync 2.0. The system Color Management Module (CMM) was "LinoColorCMM", which was developed by Linotype-Hell AG (now part of Heidelberger Druckmaschinen AG). The same CMM was used in Microsoft Windows 2000 and XP under the rubric of "Image Color Management" (ICM). Apple, with the help of Adobe had ported ColorSync 2.0 and its SDK to Microsoft Windows. With ColorSync 3.0, the Windows version which was initially planned was discontinued. ColorSync 4.0 is the latest version, introduced in Mac OS X 10.1.

== Overview ==
Human color perception is a very complex and subtle process, and different devices have widely different color gamuts or ranges of color they can display. To deal with these issues, ColorSync provides several different methods of doing color matching. For instance, perceptual matching tries to preserve as closely as possible the relative relationships between colors, even if all the colors must be systematically distorted in order to get them to fit within the gamut of the destination device. Because the human eye is more sensitive to color differences rather than absolute colors, this method tends to produce the best-looking results, subjectively speaking, for many common uses, but there are other methods that work better in some cases.

== Profiles and color spaces ==
As dictated by the ICC system, the profile connection space in ColorSync is the CIE XYZ color space. All image input and output devices (scanners, printers, displays) have to be characterized by providing an ICC profile that defines how their color information is to be interpreted relative to this reference color space. This profile might be provided by the device manufacturer, but for better quality results, it might be generated by performing actual measurements on the device with a colorimeter. Thus, when an image is scanned on a scanner, the image file will include a copy of the scanner's profile to characterize the meaning of its color information. Then, before the image is sent to an output device, a matching process converts the color information at the time of rendering from the source profile (that attached to the image) to the destination profile (that attached to the output device) so that the resulting colors print or display as closely as possible to the original image.

== ColorSync Utility ==
ColorSync Utility
- Developer: Apple Computer
- Stable release: 12.0.0
- Operating system: macOS
- Type: Graphics utility
- License: Proprietary
- Website: www.apple.com/macosx/features/colorsync

ColorSync Utility is software that ships with Mac OS X. It is used for management of color profiles and filters used in Apple's PDF workflow, or applying filters to images and PDF documents.

The interface is composed of two parts: the document browser and the utility window. The document browser lets you zoom in and out of an image or apply a Filter to it. The utility window has several options: Profile First Aid, Profiles, Devices, Filters and Calculator.

- Profile First Aid allows you to repair ColorSync color profiles so they conform to the International Color Consortium specification.
- Profiles allows you to browse the profiles installed on your system, grouped by location, class or space, and graphically compare any two profiles.
- The profile map is displayed as a rotatable, scalable 3D object and can be plotted in CIELAB, CIELUV, Yxy, Yuv and CIEXYZ.
- The Devices section allows you to see a list of all registered ColorSync devices such as your displays and printers, and see what ColorSync profile is applied to each one. You can also override the default setting.
- The Filters section allows you to build and modify PDF filters that are available to the rest of the operating system. Each filter can be set to appear in one of three domains: Application, PDF Workflows, and Printing.

Filters set to Printing will appear in the drop-down menu under the "Save as PDF..." button in the standard Mac OS X print dialog box. Filters set to PDF Workflow will appear in the Quartz Filters drop-down menu in the ColorSync section of a print dialog box. The default filters that ship with Mac OS X are:

- Black & White
- Blue Tone
- Create Generic PDFX-3 Document
- Gray Tone
- Lightness Decrease
- Lightness Increase
- Reduce File Size
- Sepia Tone.

User-created filters can have color management, image effects, PDF retouch, domain selection and comments.

The Color Management section allows assigning a profile, choosing a default profile, rendering intent, converting to a profile or intermediate transform.

The Intermediate Transform section allows adjustment of brightness, tint, hue, saturation, bilevel (high pass filter) or profile assignment, to either grayscale, RGB or CMYK, or all data in the file. This can be applied to either text, graphics, images or shading.

Complex filters can be created by stacking multiple effects. Any changes made to the PDF file can then be saved as a new PDF file.

Calculator can convert between RGB, CMYK and other color value schemes, and features an interactive color-picker for identifying a color on the screen, duplicating a feature of another bundled utility, Digital Color Meter.
