= Windows Photo Viewer =

Image viewing software

- Windows Photo Viewer running on Windows 10
- Developer: Microsoft
- Operating system: Windows Picture and Fax Viewer: Windows XP; Windows Server 2003; Windows Photo Viewer: Windows 7; Windows 8; Windows 8.1; Windows 10 (hidden); Windows 11 (hidden)
- Predecessor: Windows Picture and Fax Viewer: Imaging for Windows; Windows Photo Viewer: Windows Photo Gallery
- Successor: Windows Picture and Fax Viewer: Windows Photo Gallery; Windows Photo Viewer: Microsoft Photos
- License: Proprietary
- Website: Windows Picture and Fax Viewer: Official website at the Wayback Machine (archived 5 January 2008); Windows Photo Viewer: Official website at the Wayback Machine (archived 2 December 2010)

Windows Photo Viewer (formerly Windows Picture and Fax Viewer) is an image viewer included with the Windows NT family of operating systems. It was first included with Windows XP and Windows Server 2003 under its former name, succeeding Imaging for Windows. It was removed in Windows Vista and was replaced with Windows Photo Gallery, but was reinstated in Windows 7 under its current name.

Windows Photo Viewer can show individual pictures, display all pictures in a folder as a slide show, reorient them in 90° increments, print them either directly or via an online print service, send them in e-mail or burn them to a disc. It is deprecated in Windows 10 onwards in favor of a Universal Windows Platform app called Photos, and the program can no longer be accessed by normal means, however it can be re-enabled by editing the registry.

== Features ==
=== Windows Picture and Fax Viewer ===
Windows XP includes Windows Picture and Fax Viewer which is based on GDI+ and is capable of viewing image formats supported by GDI+, namely, JPEG, BMP, PNG, GIF (including animated GIFs), ICO, WMF, EMF and TIFF format files. It supersedes part of the functions of Imaging for Windows in previous versions of Windows.

The Windows Picture and Fax Viewer is integrated with Windows Explorer for functions like slideshow, email, printing etc. and quickly starts up when an image is double clicked in Windows Explorer. It supports full file management from within the viewer itself, that is, right clicking the image shows the same context menu as the one shown when an image is right clicked in Windows Explorer. Images can be set as the desktop wallpaper from the context menu. It supports successive viewing of all images in current folder and looping through images, that is, after viewing the last image in a directory, it again shows the first image and vice versa. By default, images smaller than the user's display resolution are shown at their actual size. If an image is larger than the display resolution, it is scaled to fit the screen (Best Fit). Images can be zoomed in or out depending on the viewing area. When this is done, scroll bars allow for viewing of all areas of the image. It has Standard toolbar buttons for Delete, Print, Copy to and Open with. The Copy to button converts an image to a different format supported in GDI+, that is, JPEG, BMP, GIF, TIFF or PNG. The Print button starts the Photo Printing Wizard which allows printing images with picture titles using various page layouts such as full page prints, wallet prints, contact/index sheets or certain fixed dimensions with the images cropped or rotated to fit the page. The wizard shows a preview of what the printed page will look like with the currently specified options. Windows Picture and Fax Viewer can also rotate images clockwise or anti-clockwise, start a slideshow of all or selected images in the folder, or e-mail them by selecting the "Send To Mail Recipient" option. Further options allow the image to be mailed full size, or in pixel dimensions of: 640 x 480, 800 x 600, and 1024 x 768. Using Tweak UI, the time between images during a slideshow can be adjusted.

Windows Picture and Fax Viewer recognizes embedded ICC V2 color profiles in JPG and TIFF files. GIF files are shown with full animation, even when zoomed. TIFF files can be annotated using the Annotation Toolbar which appears at the bottom of the screen. Lines can be drawn on the TIFF image and text added to it. Areas of the image can be selected and concealed. The Windows Picture and Fax Viewer is also capable of viewing multi-page TIFF files. However TIFF images with JPEG compression are not fully supported. The last button on the standard toolbar opens the image for editing; by default, in Microsoft Paint; however any editing application can be registered for this button in the viewer. Windows Picture and Fax Viewer saves and remembers its window position and size and supports keyboard shortcuts for all of its operations.

Raw image formats, which are the preferred formats in professional photography are not supported, however, Microsoft released a later update called RAW Image Thumbnailer and Viewer for Windows XP for viewing certain raw image files.

Unlike with Imaging for Windows, Windows Picture and Fax Viewer does not include the advanced features of said application.

=== Windows Photo Viewer ===
Windows Photo Viewer introduces a number of changes compared to Windows Picture and Fax Viewer. Whereas the previous application used GDI+, Windows Photo Viewer uses Windows Imaging Component (WIC) and takes advantage of Windows Display Driver Model. The user interface is similar to that of Windows Photo Gallery in Windows Vista, but without the editing capabilities or the gallery view of the application it had replaced.

Windows Photo Viewer supports images in BMP, JPEG, JPEG XR (formerly HD Photo), PNG, ICO, GIF and TIFF file formats, with RAW, WEBP and HEIC formats being supported by third-party WIC codecs. Although GIF files are supported in Windows Photo Viewer, Windows Photo Viewer doesn't display any animated GIFs on its own and only shows the first frame whereas Windows Picture and Fax Viewer displays them in full. Windows Picture and Fax Viewer was also capable of viewing multi-page TIFF files (except those that employ JPEG compression) as well as annotating the TIFF files, whereas Windows Photo Viewer cannot, though it does handle multi-page WEBP files (if supported by a third-party codec). On the other hand, Windows Photo Viewer has added support for ICC Profiles (Windows Picture and Fax Viewer did have support for ICC Profiles but only for v2).

== Bugs ==
=== Windows Photo Viewer ===
Some devices and Android phones are able to take photos and screenshots and have a custom ICC Profile being applied to said pictures, however Windows Photo Viewer will display an error when trying to display the picture with the message "Windows Photo Viewer can't display this picture because there might not be enough memory available on your computer" when an unknown ICC Profile is detected. There is a patch available on GitHub that fixes this behavior. Also, when a custom Display ICC Profile is applied after installing a Monitor driver, Windows Photo Viewer wrongly shifts the picture hue to a warm tint. This feature is intentional but is greatly exaggerated. This can be fixed by removing or replacing the Display ICC Profile.

== Later versions of Windows ==
In support documentation, Microsoft states that Windows Photo Viewer is not part of Windows 10, and a user still has it only if they upgraded from Windows 7 or 8.1. However, it can be brought back in Windows 10 and later with registry editing, by manually adding the appropriate entries ("capabilities") in HKEY_LOCAL_MACHINE\SOFTWARE\Microsoft\Windows Photo Viewer\Capabilities\FileAssociations. It is also possible to restore the Preview option in the context menu the same way. Third-party utilities are also available to facilitate activation of Windows Photo Viewer in newer Windows versions.

Windows Photo Viewer itself remains built-in into Windows as of 2025; up until Windows 11 version 25H2, Windows Photo Viewer was still set by default for TIFF files with the extensions ".tif" and ".tiff".

== See also ==
- Imaging for Windows
- Comparison of image viewers
- Windows Color Management
