= Windows Color System =

Windows Color System (WCS) is a platform for color management, first included with Windows Vista, that aims to achieve color consistency across various software and hardware, including cameras, monitors, printers and scanners.

== System ==
Different devices interpret the same colors differently, according to their software and hardware configurations. As a result, they must be properly calibrated to reproduce colors consistently across different devices. WCS aims to make this process of color calibration automatic and transparent, as an evolution of ICC profiles.

Windows Color System features a Color Infrastructure and Translation Engine (CITE) at its core. It is backed up by a color processing pipeline that supports bit-depths more than 32 bits per pixel, multiple color channels (more than three), alternative color spaces and high dynamic range coloring, using a technology named Kyuanos developed by Canon. The color processing pipeline allows device developers to add their own gamut mapping algorithm into the pipeline to customize the color response of the device. The new pipeline also supports floating point calculations to minimize round-off errors, which are inherent in integer processing. Once the color pipeline finishes processing the colors, the CITE engine applies a color translation according to a color profile, specific to a device to ensure the output color matches to what is expected.

WCS features explicit support for LCD as well as CRT monitors, projectors, printers, and other imaging devices and provides customized support for each. WCS uses color profiles according to CIECAM02, defined using XML, to define how the color representation actually translates to a visible color. ICC V4 color profiles are also supported. Windows Photo Gallery and Photo Viewer only support the deprecated V2 standard and show dark images when used with V4 profiles; Windows Imaging Component, the HD Photo format, XPS print path and XPS documents all support color management.

WCS is a superset of Image Color Management (ICM), which was first included with Windows 95, Windows 98, Windows 2000, Windows Me, Windows XP, and Windows Server 2003.

== See also ==
- Features new to Windows Vista
- Windows Vista printing technologies
