= UFRaw =

Software for processing raw image formats

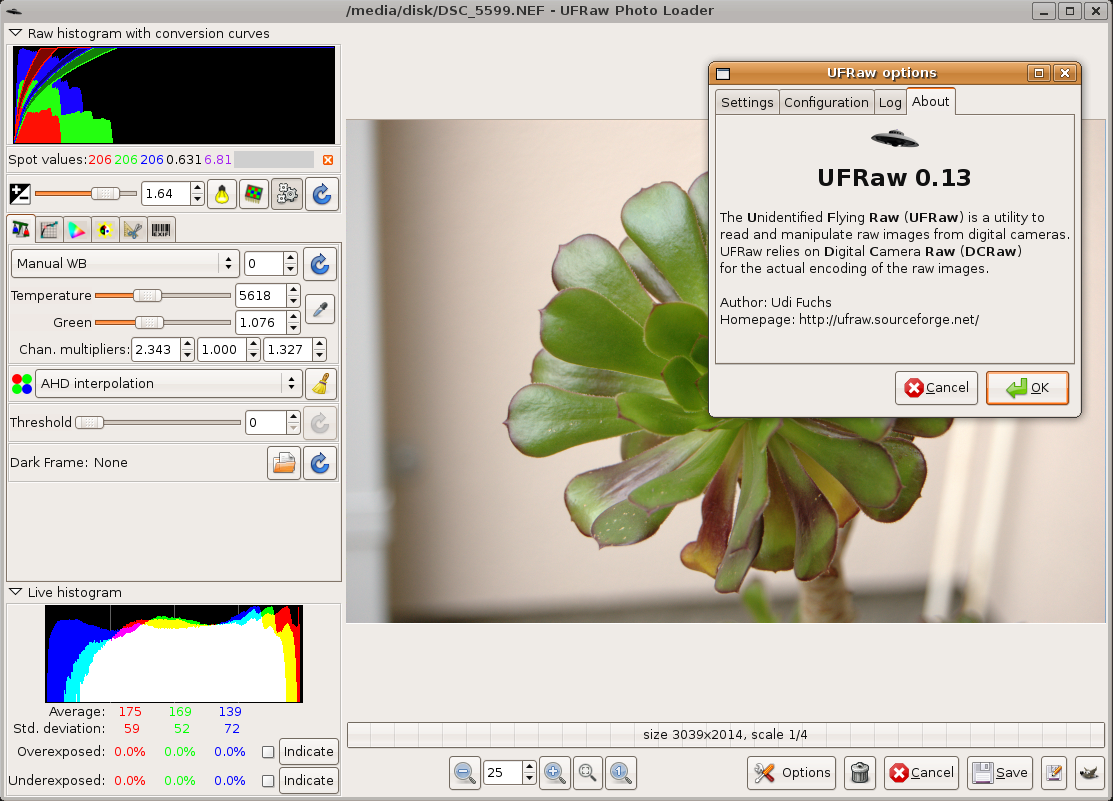
- Original author(s): Udi Fuchs
- Stable release: 0.22 / 17 June 2015
- Written in: C, C++
- Operating system: Linux, Mac OS X, Windows
- Type: Post-production tool for photography
- License: GNU General Public License
- Website: ufraw.sourceforge.net

UFRaw (originally named after its founder Udi Fuchs's Raw, the backronym Unidentified Flying Raw replaced it as the full name) is an application which can read and manipulate photographs in raw image formats, as created by many digital cameras. UFRaw is available as both as a stand-alone program and as a plugin for GIMP (only on non-Microsoft Windows systems). As a stand-alone program, UFRaw can be invoked with a graphical interface, or as a command line batch processing utility.

UFRaw reads raw images, using dcraw as a back end, and supports color management via LittleCMS, allowing the user to apply input, output, and display color profiles. This allows UFRaw to support a variety of raw image formats.

UFRaw has been unmaintained since 17 December 2016.

GIMP 2.8.x is compatible with latest versions of ufraw. ufraw 0.19.2 is compatible with GIMP 2.8.14 in Windows XP+.

== nUFRaw ==
nUFRaw is an actively developed fork of UFRaw. It remains open source, and is licensed under the GNU General Public License. It is compatible with GIMP 2.10.22.

== See also ==
- Darktable
- Linux color management
- Rawstudio is a similar GTK-based application
- RawTherapee
