= Colorimeter =

For articles on Colorimeter see:

- Colorimeter (chemistry)
- Tristimulus colorimeter

== See also ==
- Colorimetry
- Colorimetry (chemical method)
- Calorimeter
