= LCMS (disambiguation) =

LCMS refers to the Lutheran Church – Missouri Synod, a conservative Lutheran body in the United States.

LCMS may also refer to:

== Science and technology ==
- Liquid chromatography–mass spectrometry, a chemical analysis technique
- Learning content management system
- LittleCMS, an open-source color management system

== Organizations ==
- Lindero Canyon Middle School, Agoura Hills, California, United States
- Los Cerritos Middle School, Thousand Oaks, California, United States
- Lutheran Church in Malaysia and Singapore
