= Bitmap file =

"Bitmap file" may be a generic term for:

- A file format for storing raster graphics
- A computer file containing a raster graphics image

Bitmap file may also refer to:

- Windows bitmap, or BMP, a particular graphics file format
