= Imaging for Windows =

Software product for scanning paper documents

- Imaging for Windows running under Windows 2000 Professional
- Developer(s): Microsoft
- Operating system: Microsoft Windows
- Successor: Windows Picture and Fax Viewer

Imaging for Windows from Global 360 is document imaging software. Earlier versions of Imaging for Windows were available for Windows 95 OSR2, Windows 98, Windows Me, Windows NT 4.0, Windows 2000. Global360 Imaging for Windows is the upgrade to this Imaging software, which was discontinued as of Windows XP. Its image viewing, editing and scanning functions are superseded by Windows Picture and Fax Viewer and Microsoft Paint, both of which are based on GDI+ in Windows XP. However, the multi-page picture editing functions are gone with the Imaging software.

Imaging for Windows was developed by Wang (as in Windows 95/NT 4.0), was later absorbed by Kodak (as Eastman Software, as in Windows 98/2000), then becoming eiStream Inc., later to be renamed to Global 360. Currently Imaging for Windows 4.0 is available through OpenText. Professional Edition was sold as stand alone product with support for advanced features like OCR.

Imaging for Windows supports creating, annotating, viewing, and printing TIFF, BMP, and Microsoft Fax AWD image documents. Users can also view and print JPEG and PCX/DCX images.

Imaging for Windows also provides the ability to develop software using ActiveX tools. Each copy includes the Kodak/Wang Imaging OCX (ActiveX) controls - ImgEdit, ImgAdmin, ImgThumb, ImgScan and ImgOCR controls are provided.
