= Monitor proofing =

Monitor proofing or soft-proofing is a step in the prepress printing process. It uses specialized computer software and hardware to check the accuracy of text and images used for printed products. Monitor proofing differs from conventional forms of “hard-copy” or ink-on-paper color proofing in its use of a calibrated display(s) as the output device.

Monitor proofing systems rely on calibration, profiling and color management to produce an accurate representation of how images will look when printed. While a “soft-proof” function has existed in desktop publishing applications for some time, commercial monitor proofing extends this capability to multiple users and multiple locations by specifying the hardware to be used, and by enforcing one set of calibration procedures and color management policies for all users of the system. This ensures that all viewers are calibrated to a known set of conditions, and given hardware of equal capabilities will therefore be viewing the same color on screen.

== System Components ==
Monitor proofing systems consist of the following hardware and software components:

=== Computer with calibration and profiling software ===
Calibration and profiling software is often provided by, or bundled with the monitor proofing application by the software vendor. Color management support for ICC profiles created by the monitor proofing system is available through the operating system on most Windows, Macintosh and Linux computers.

=== Graphics monitor ===
High-quality monitors are a key enabling technology for monitor proofing systems. The International Organization for Standardization (ISO) finalized the standards for color proofing on displays in 2004 and since this publication date manufacturers including Apple, EIZO and NEC have produced LCD displays used in monitor proofing systems.

=== Calibration hardware and software ===
A colorimeter or spectrophotometer is used in conjunction with special calibration software to adjust the primary RGB monitor gains, set the white point to the desired color temperature and optionally set the monitor luminance to a specified levels. The calibration target for a monitor proofing system is typically D50 (5000K) and should be at least 160 cd/m2 luminance as specified in ISO 12646.

=== Monitor Proofing Application Software ===
Monitor proofing application software integrates the necessary color management tools with a viewing application containing markup, review and approval tools and some form of routing or collaboration. Proofing assets reside in a database and are made available for viewing over LAN or Internet connections via client-server connections.

== Third Party Certification ==
SWOP and Fogra offer independent third party certifications to ensure that a monitor proofing system is capable of reproducing certain reference printing conditions tied to known and traceable standards. A monitor proof that is prepared in accordance with these certification programs can serve as a contract proof or legal binding agreement between the proof provider and customer.
