= Windows Imaging Component =

Codec framework in Windows Vista

- Developer: Microsoft
- Operating system: Windows NT family
- Type: Application programming interface
- License: docs.microsoft.com/en-gb/windows/win32/wic/-wic-lh

Windows Imaging Component (WIC) is a COM-based imaging codec framework introduced in Windows Vista (and later available in Windows XP Service Pack 3) for working with and processing digital images and image metadata.

WIC enables application developers to perform image processing operations on any image format through a single set of common APIs, without requiring prior knowledge of specific image formats.

== Features ==
Windows Imaging Component provides an extensible architecture for image codecs, pixel formats, and metadata, with automatic run-time discovery of new formats. It supports reading and writing of arbitrary metadata in image files, with the ability to preserve unrecognized metadata during editing. While working with images, it preserves high bit depth image data, up to 32 bits per channel, throughout the revamped high dynamic range image processing pipeline built into Windows Vista.

Windows Imaging Component supports Windows Color System, the ICC V4-compliant color management technology in Windows Vista.

=== Codecs ===
By default, Windows Vista ships with JPEG, TIFF, GIF, PNG, BMP and HD Photo encoders and decoders, and an ICO decoder. Additionally, as of 2009, some camera manufacturers and 3rd-parties have released WIC codecs for proprietary raw image formats, enabling Mac-like raw image support to Windows 7 and Vista. In July 2011, this was extended significantly by Microsoft itself by providing a separate Codec Pack for most current digital cameras. The Progressive Graphics File (PGF) viewer is distributed with a WIC codec.

=== Metadata ===
WIC supports Exchangeable Image File (Exif), PNG textual metadata, image file directory (IFD), IPTC Information Interchange Model (IPTC), and Extensible Metadata Platform (XMP) formats. In addition, WIC includes an extensible framework to support third-party metadata implementations.

Metadata format support is per codec. For example, the native JPEG codec supports XMP but the native GIF and PNG codecs do not.

== Usage ==
=== WIC in Microsoft products ===
WIC is available for Windows XP with Service Pack 2, as a stand-alone downloadable program, and is built into Windows XP with Service Pack 3. It is also available as part of .NET Framework 3.0. A discontinued PowerToy for Windows XP from Microsoft, known as Photo Info, which allows viewing and editing image metadata from Windows Explorer, also uses WIC.

Starting with Windows Vista, Windows Explorer, and Windows Photo Gallery, are based on WIC and can thus view and organize images in any format for which a WIC codec is installed. Office 2010 and later versions of the core Office apps (Word, Excel, PowerPoint and Outlook) can import image file formats supported by WIC.

Starting with Windows 7, Windows Media Center (available on Windows 7 Home Premium and above) is WIC-enabled. Also, the GDI+ graphic library is built on WIC, although GDI+ does not load 3rd-party or external codecs. With Windows 7 the WIC stack itself underwent a major overhaul and is now free-threaded, as are all the built-in and external codecs shipping with Windows. Being free-threaded is also a requirement for new codecs targeting Windows 7.

Microsoft Expression Design's import and export capabilities are entirely based on WIC. Expression Media (now Phase One Media Pro) with Service Pack 1 and later also supports additional raw camera formats and HD Photo (now JPEG XR) using WIC.

=== Third-party support ===
As of 2018, few third-party imaging applications (image editors, image organizers and image viewers) utilize WIC.

FastPictureViewer, a simple standalone third-party image viewer, supports standard image formats along with HD Photo and RAW camera formats (NRW, NEF, CR2, DNG) using WIC. An experimental WIC import plug-in for Adobe Photoshop can also be found on FastPictureViewer's website.

Another WIC import plug-in for GIMP can be found at Gimp-Forum.net.

== See also ==
- Core Image
