= Little CMS =

- Original author(s): Marti Maria
- Developer(s): Marti Maria; Bob Friesenhahn; Kai-Uwe Behrmann; Stuart Nixon; Jordi Vilar; Richard Hughes; Auke Nauta; Chris Evans (Google); Lorenzo Ridolfi; Robin Watts (Artifex); Shawn Pedersen; Andrew Brygin; Samuli Suominen; Florian Höch; Aurelien Jarno; Claudiu Cebuc; Michael Vhrel (Artifex); Michal Cihar; Daniel Kaneider; Mateusz Jurczyk (Google); Paul Miller; Sébastien Léon; Christian Schmitz; XhmikosR; Stanislav Brabec (SuSe); Leonhard Gruenschloss (Google); Patrick Noffke; Christopher James Halse Rogers; John Hein
- Initial release: 1998; 27 years ago
- Stable release: 2.17 / 9 February 2025; 7 months ago
- Repository: github.com/mm2/Little-CMS
- Written in: C
- Operating system: Cross-platform
- Type: Color management
- License: MIT License
- Website: littlecms.com

Little CMS or LCMS is an open-source color management system, released as a software library for use in other programs which will allow the use of International Color Consortium profiles. It is licensed under the terms of the MIT License.

LCMS was one of the first open sourced color management systems. It was initiated by Marti Maria in 1998. As part of the development efforts and as a proof of concept, Marti also made LPROF, a Qt-based profiler suite demonstrating the capabilities of LCMS.

LCMS was hosted on SourceForge.net in 2001, and has had a stable set of releases since then. It is commonly part of many Linux distributions.

LPROF was orphaned and unsupported from early 2004 until August 2005, when LPROF moved from Marti's site to SourceForge.net and active maintenance was taken over by Gerard Klaver, Craig Ringer and Hal Engel. It is now back in development again (with Marti's consent), and is reportedly producing profiles of high quality. LPROF has also started to use parts of the functionality of Argyll CMS, another open source CMS by Graeme Gill.

== Usage ==
LCMS has been used in:

- ABCpdf
- ACDSee since ACDSee Pro 6.0
- Darktable
- Digikam
- Foxit Reader
- GIMP
- GraphicsMagick
- ICC Examin
- ImageMagick
- Inkscape
- Krita
- Media Player Classic
- Microsoft Office for Mac 2011
- Mozilla Firefox up to version 3
- OpenJDK
- Opera
- RawTherapee
- Scribus
- UFRaw
- VueScan
- Google Picasa
- mpv
- Many commercial products

== See also ==
- Color space
- Linux color management
