= Windows 2.x =

Windows 2.x means either of, or all of the following versions of Microsoft Windows:

- Windows 2.0
- Windows 2.1
