= Siril (software) =

Astrophotography software application

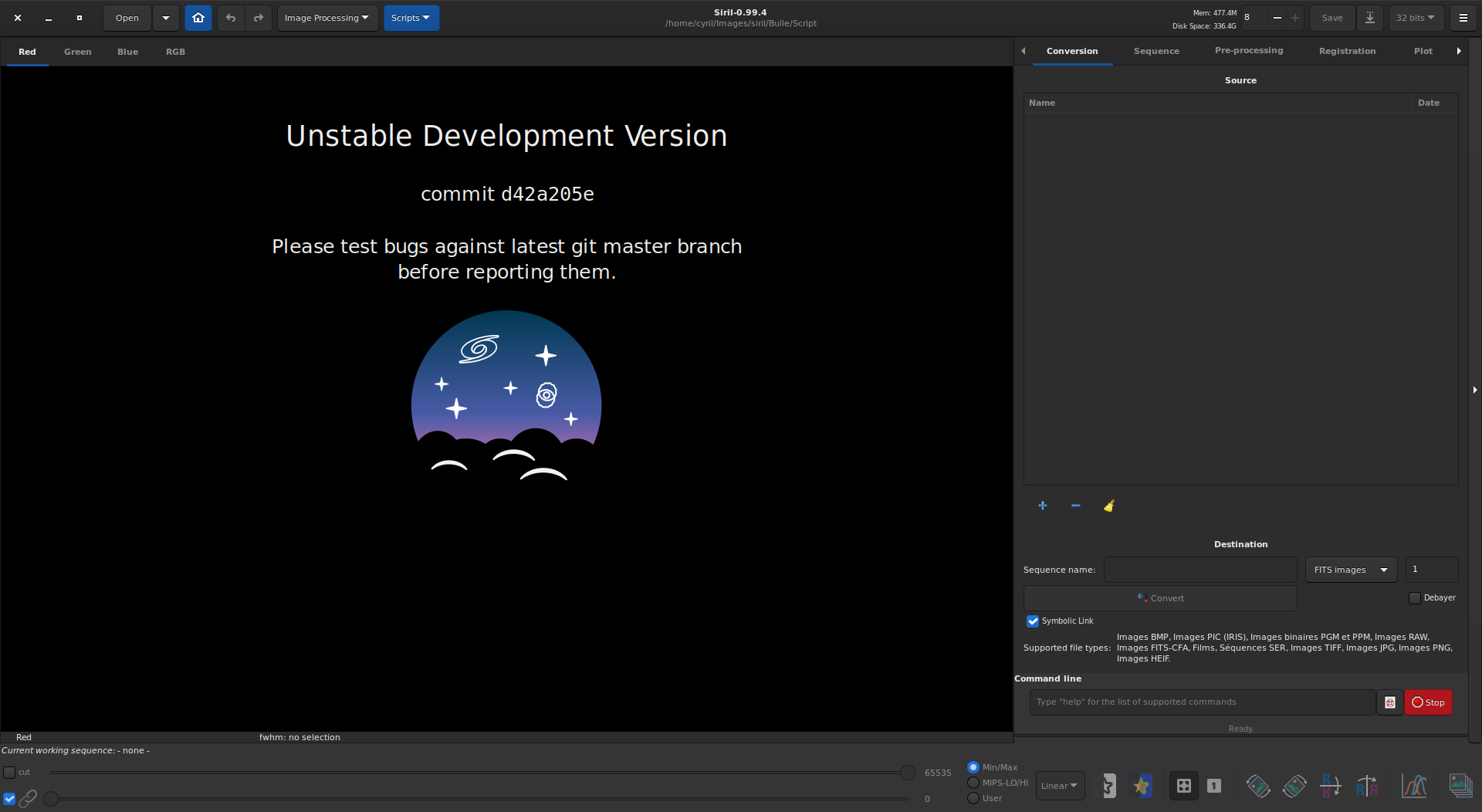
- Screenshot Screenshot of Siril 0.99.4 on Linux (Debian Testing).
- Developer: Siril Team
- Release: February 6, 2005
- Stable release: 1.4.2 / 18 February 2026; 5 months ago
- Written in: C, C++
- Operating system: Cross-platform
- Available in: Multilingual
- License: GNU General Public License v3.0 only
- Website: www.siril.org
- Repository: gitlab.com/free-astro/siril

Siril is a software application for astrophotography, which allows pre-processing and processing of images from any type of camera (CCD, planetary camera, webcam etc.). The images must be converted to 32-bit FITS format which is the format used natively by Siril. It is also possible to use the SER format (limited to 16 bits), generally used during "fast" planetary or deep sky acquisitions, without prior conversion.

It is based on the GNOME environment and therefore can be run on many systems like Linux, FreeBSD, MacOS, and Windows.

It is free software distributed under the terms of the GNU GPL.

== History ==
The project was launched in 2005 by François Meyer. Siril was initially developed as a clone of Christian Buil's IRIS software, in order to overcome the lack of astronomical image processing software under the Linux system; hence the name SIRI-L (IRIS for Linux). A new team took over development of the project in 2012 after a pause from 2007.

== Features ==
Siril allows the conversion of a large number of formats (images or videos) to FITS.

- The calibration, alignment and stacking of astronomical images is done by navigating through the tabs of the "control center". However, an algorithm for the automatic detection and correction of defective pixels is available off the tab, in the Image processing menu.
- Since version 0.9.7, the global alignment which uses a recognized algorithm for this task has been added an optimization method thanks to the OpenCV library. In fact, Siril's automatic alignment allows to align images obtained with instruments of different focal lengths.
- Some image processing algorithms are available in the standard menu, such as Histogram Transformation, Color Calibration, and Banding Reduction
- Siril has a photometric analysis tool. Therefore, it is possible to study the transits of exoplanets, the variability of stars or even occultations. This tool requires the installation of gnuplot.
- Since version 0.9.9, the ability to create scripts has been integrated into Siril. All you have to do is drop script files with the .ssf extension in a folder named 'scripts' and whose location is defined in the program's settings. After a restart, a new menu entry appears and allows the execution of the installed scripts. Preprocessing + alignment + stacking can thus be fully automated.
- Since version 0.9.9, it is also possible to launch Siril through the console and run a script without the GUI. This can be useful when piloting a telescope remotely and only want to recover the pre-processed image. For example, entering the following command in a terminal runs the Processing.ssf script in the M31 images directory:

siril -s ~/.siril/scripts/Traitememnt.ssf -d ~/Images/M31

- Version 0.9.10 allows commands to be sent through one named pipe while logs and status can be obtained through

another. The mode is activated the command line argument -p.

- Since version 1.4, Siril provides the Drizzle algorithm for stacking monochrome and color images.

== Native file formats ==
=== FITS ===
Currently, Siril works internally with 32-bit FITS floating point images. Users can configure the program to work in unsigned 16-bit FITS format, in order to save computation time and disk space at the expense of image accuracy. Compression of FITS images is supported since version 0.99.4.

=== SER ===
The SER file format is a simple image sequence format, similar to uncompressed movies. Files in this format, widely preferred by astrophotographers in planetary imaging, do not need to be converted and can be edited on the fly.

== Screenshot gallery ==
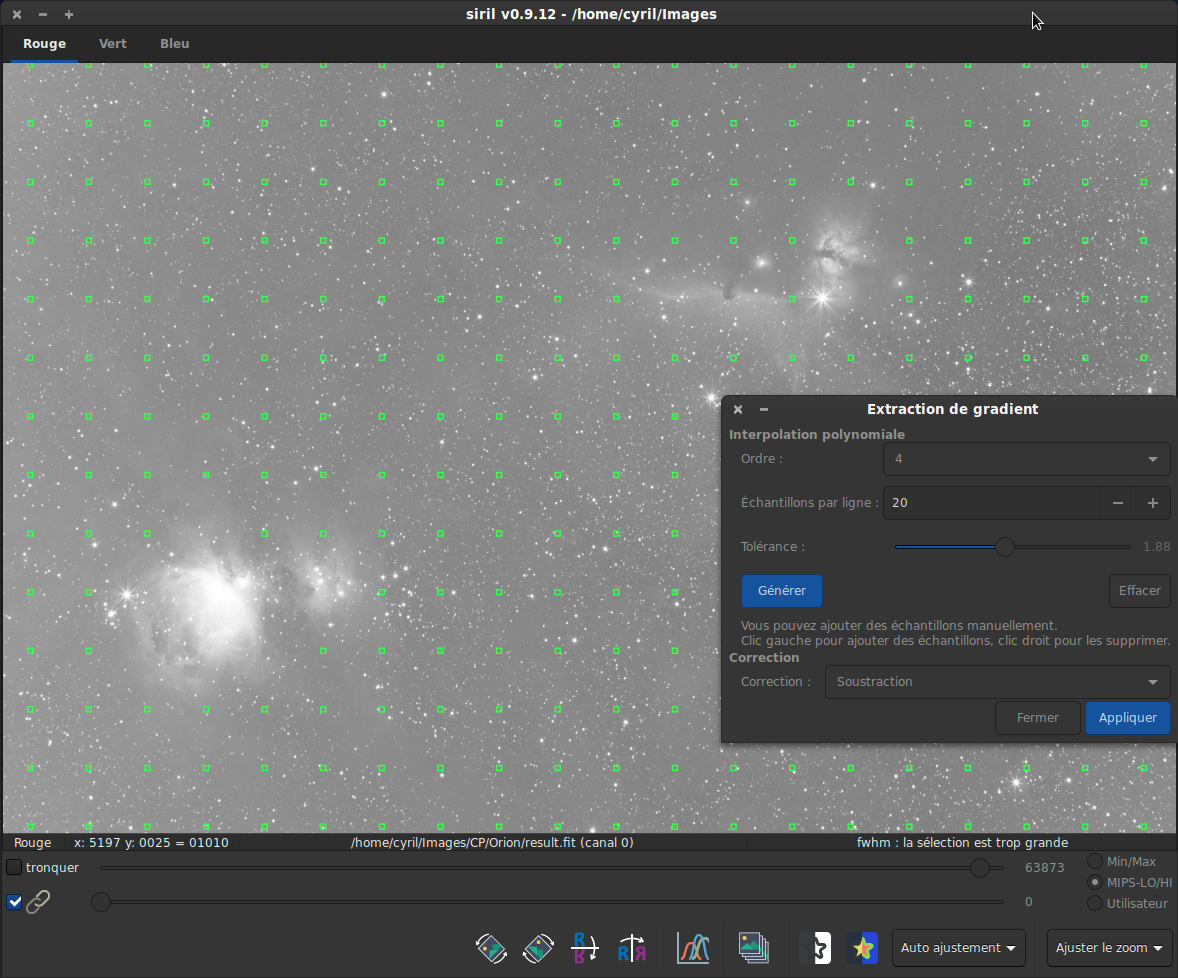
Gradient removal

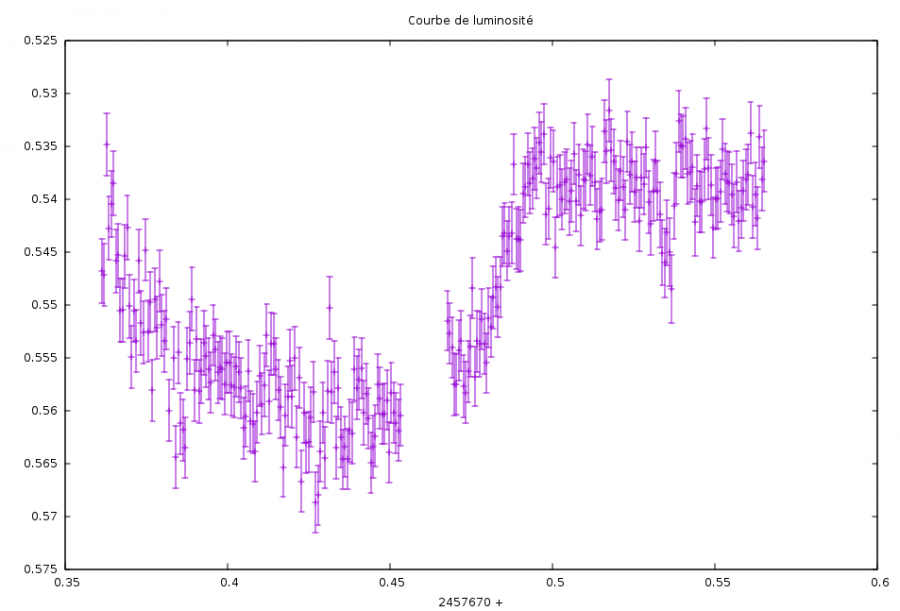
Detecting an exoplanet using a light curve
