= International Color Consortium =

Computing color standard organization

- Abbreviation: ICC
- Formation: 1993; 33 years ago
- Type: Consortium
- Purpose: Promote the use and adoption of open, vendor-neutral, cross-platform color management systems.
- Headquarters: Reston, Virginia, U.S.
- Region served: Worldwide
- Co-Chairs: William Li (Kodak), Max Derhak (Onyx Graphics)
- Key people: Debbie Orf (Secretary), Phil Green (Technical Secretary)
- Website: International Color Consortium

The International Color Consortium (ICC) was formed in 1993 by eight vendors in order to create an open, vendor-neutral color management system which would function transparently across all operating systems and software packages.

== Overview ==
The ICC specification, currently on version 4.4, allows for matching of color when moved between applications and operating systems, from the point of creation to the final output, whether display or print. This specification is technically identical to ISO 15076-1:2010, available from ISO.

The ICC profile describes the color attributes of a particular device or viewing requirement by defining a mapping between the source or target color space and a profile connection space (PCS).

The ICC defines the specification precisely but does not define algorithms or processing details. As such, applications or systems that work with different ICC profiles are allowed to vary.

ICC has also published a preliminary specification for iccMAX, a next-generation color management architecture with significantly expanded functionality and a choice of colorimetric, spectral, or material connection space. Details are at https://www.color.org/iccmax/

== Membership ==
The eight founding members of the ICC were Adobe, Agfa, Apple, Kodak, Microsoft, Silicon Graphics, Sun Microsystems, and Taligent. Sun Microsystems, Silicon Graphics, and Taligent have since left the organization.

As of September 2022 there are 5 founding members, 37 regular members and 18 honorary members. Most members specialize in photography, printing, or Electronic visual displays. Regular members include: BenQ, Canon, Dolby, Fuji, Heidelberg Printing Machines AG, Hewlett–Packard, Konica Minolta, Kyocera, Nikon, Seiko, Sun Chemical, Toshiba, vivo, Xerox, Xiaomi, and X-Rite.

== ICC profile specification version ==
Profile version	According specification	Notes
2.0.0	ICC 3.0 (jun 1994), 3.01 (May 1995)	
2.1.0	ICC 3.2 (nov 1995), 3.3 (nov 1996), 3.4 (aug 1997)	
2.2.0	ICC.1:1998-09	
2.3.0	ICC.1A:1999-04	Addendum to ICC.1:1998-09
2.4.0	ICC.1:2001-04	Minor revision for web of ICC.1:1998-09
4.0.0	ICC.1:2001-12	Revision of ICC.1:2001-04
4.1.0	ICC.1:2003-09	
4.2.0	ICC.1:2004-4	Revision of ICC.1:2003-09
4.2.0	ICC.1:2004-10	Revision of ICC.1:2003-09
4.3.0	ICC.1:2010-12	Technically identical to ISO 15076-1:2010
4.4.0.0	ICC.1:2022	Revision of ICC.1:2010

== See also ==
- International Colour Association
- International Commission on Illumination
