= Tristimulus colorimeter =

Device to measure color values

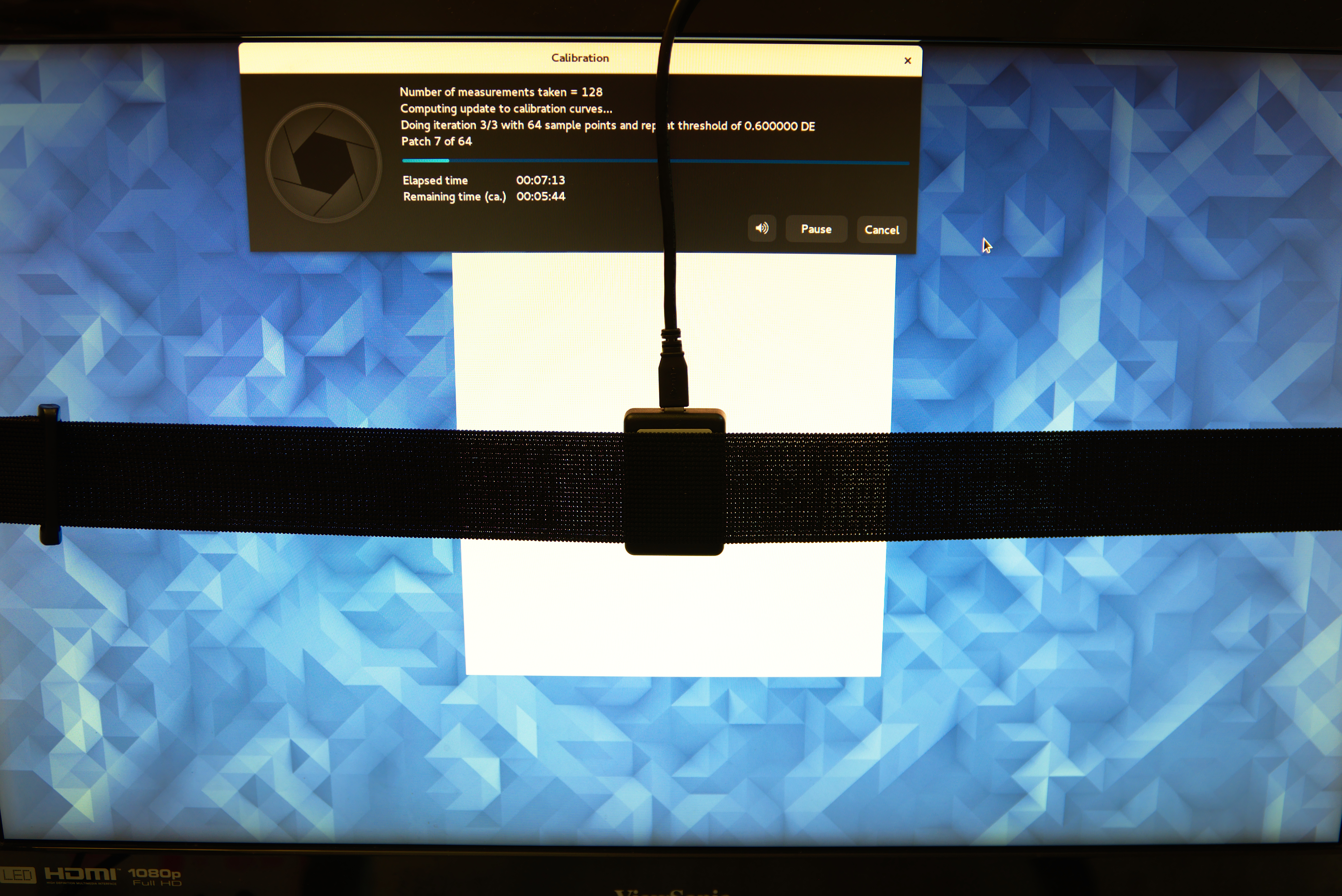
Color calibration of a monitor using ColorHug2, an open-source colorimeter, placed on the screen

A tristimulus colorimeter, colloquially shortened to colorimeter or colourimeter, is used in digital imaging to profile and calibrate output devices. It takes a limited number of wideband spectral energy readings along the visible spectrum by using filtered photodetectors; e.g. silicon photodiodes.

A colorimeter with the known value of absolute error allows measuring (x,y)-chromaticity coordinates in red, green, blue and white colors. Measured values are used for calculation of LCD profile coefficients.

Originally, three glass filters whose transmittance spectra mimicked the CIE color matching functions (shown below) were employed. A filter bank may be used to decompose the individual color matching functions if more accuracy is desired.

A camera or colorimeter is said to be colorimetric if it satisfies the Luther condition by Robert Luther (1868–1945) (also called the "Maxwell–Ives criterion"), reducing observer metamerism color errors, if the product of the spectral responsivity of the photoreceptor and the spectral transmittance of the filters is a linear combination of the CMFs.

A colorimeter or a digital camera with a color filter array can, under certain conditions, be used as an alternative to a spectrophotometer.

The illuminant and observer conditions should be specified when citing a measurement (e.g. D65/10°).

The quality of a colorimeter may be assessed using the means in CIE publication 179:2007.

There are various calibration methods for tristimulus colorimeters.

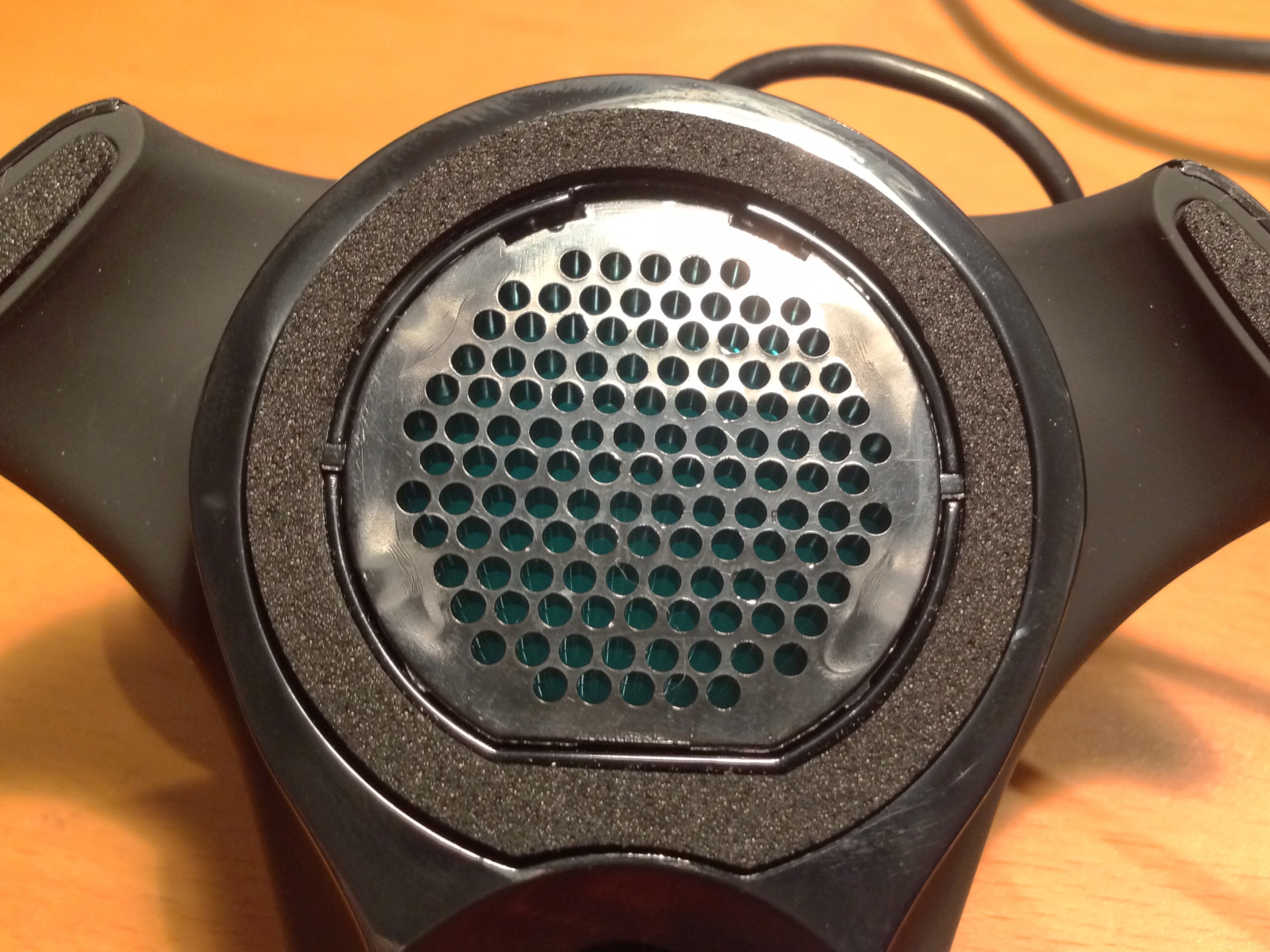
Color sensor of a colorimeter

The CIE 1931 XYZ color matching functions
