= Loupe (software) =

Default image viewer for GNOME

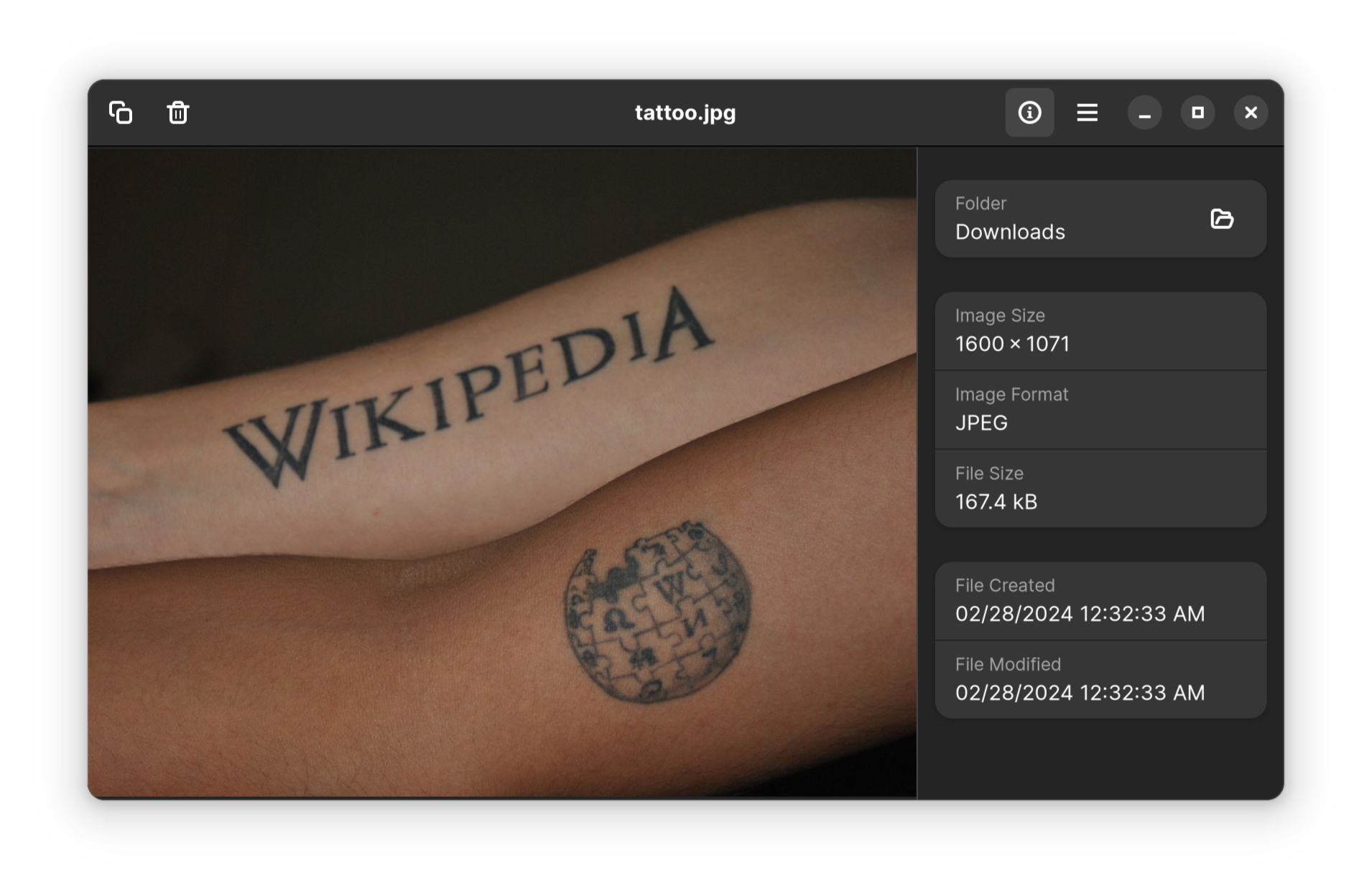
- Loupe 45.3 displaying an image
- Stable release: 48.1 / 11 April 2025; 16 months ago
- Written in: Rust
- Operating system: Linux
- Included with: GNOME
- Predecessor: Eye of GNOME
- License: GNU General Public License version 3
- Website: apps.gnome.org/Loupe/
- Repository: gitlab.gnome.org/GNOME/loupe

Loupe, also known as Image Viewer, is an image viewer created for the GNOME desktop environment. It first appeared on December 26, 2020. With the release of GNOME 45 in September 2023, Loupe became GNOME's default image viewer, replacing Eye of GNOME.

Like its predecessor, Loupe offers various options for viewing images. These include standard options such as zooming, rotation, and transparency. Other features include touchscreen support, metadata info, and sandboxed decoding.

== Image format support ==
Currently, Loupe supports all the formats that glycin does. These are:

- AVIF
- BMP
- DDS
- farbfeld (by suckless)
- QOI
- GIF
- HEIC
- ICO
- JPEG
- JPEG XL
- OpenEXR
- PNG
- PNM
- SVG
- TGA
- TIFF
- WebP

== Development ==
Loupe is licensed under the GNU General Public License v3.0. Written in the Rust programming language, it relies on glycin, an image decoding crate.

== See also ==
- Comparison of image viewers
- Eye of GNOME
- GNOME Core Applications
