= WebP =

Raster graphics file format

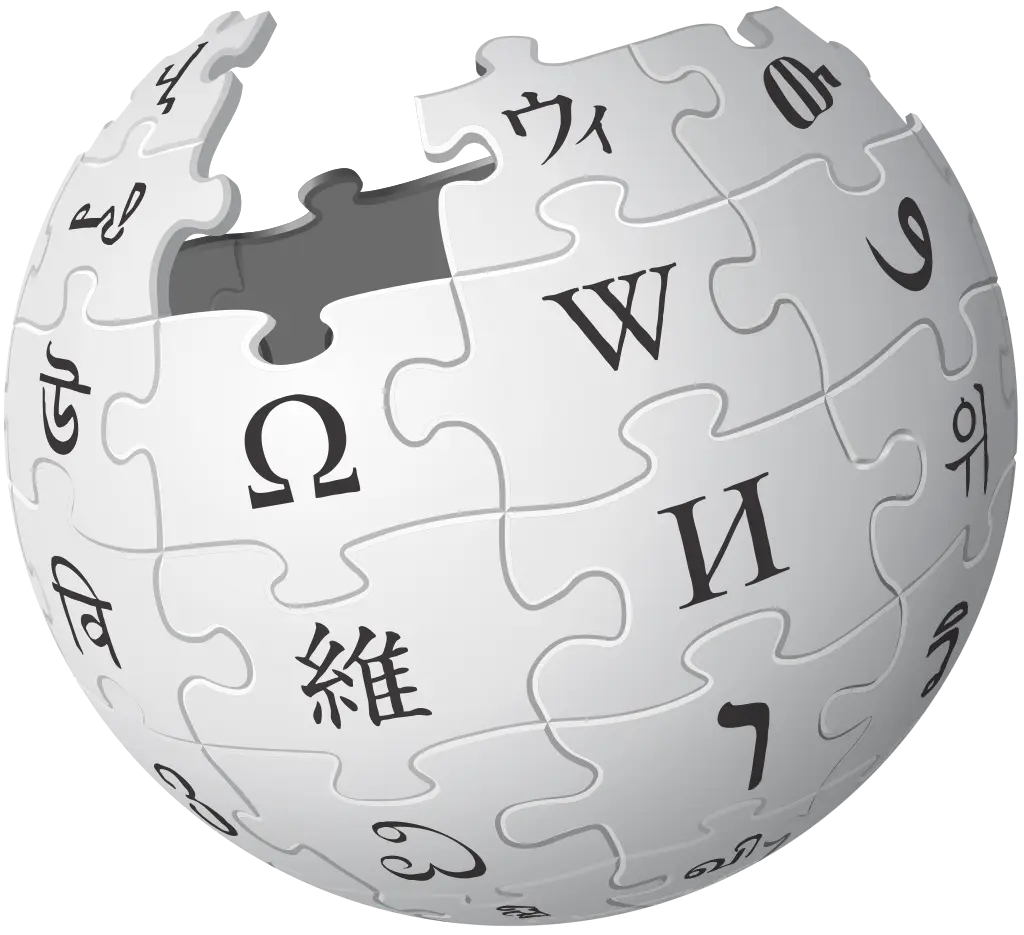
- The Wikipedia logo, as a WebP file
- Filename extension: .webp
- Internet media type: image/webp
- Uniform Type Identifier (UTI): org.webmproject.webp
- Magic number: 52 49 46 46 xx xx xx xx 57 45 42 50 56 50 38
- Developed by: Google
- Initial release: 30 September 2010; 16 years ago
- Type of format: Image file format with lossless and lossy compression
- Contained by: Resource Interchange File Format (RIFF)
- Standard: RFC 9649
- Open format?: Yes
- Free format?: Yes
- Website: developers.google.com/speed/webp

libwebp
- Developer: Google
- Release: February 23, 2011; 15 years ago
- Stable release: 1.6.0 / 9 July 2025; 15 months ago
- Written in: C
- Type: Digital imaging
- License: BSD license
- Website: developers.google.com/speed/webp
- Repository: chromium.googlesource.com/webm/libwebp

WebP is a raster graphics file format developed by Google and intended as a replacement for the JPEG, PNG, and GIF file formats on the Web. It supports image compression (both lossy and lossless), as well as animation and alpha compositing. The sister project for video is called WebM.

Google announced the WebP format in September 2010; the company released the first stable version of its supporting library in April 2018. WebP has seen widespread adoption across the Internet in order to reduce image size, with all major browsers currently supporting the format.

== History ==
WebP was first announced by Google on 30 September 2010 as a new open format for lossy compressed true-color graphics on the Web, producing files that were smaller than JPEG files for comparable image quality. It was based on technology which Google had acquired with the purchase of On2 Technologies. As a derivative of the VP8 video format, it is a sister project to the WebM multimedia container format. WebP-related software is released under a BSD free software license. The pronunciation as given by the developers is "weppy" (/ˈwɛpi/).

On 3 October 2011, Google added an "Extended File Format" allowing WebP support for animation, ICC profile, XMP and Exif metadata, and tiling (compositing very large images from maximum 16384 × 16384 tiles). Tiling support was never finalized and was removed from the spec again.

On 18 November 2011, Google announced a new lossless compression mode, and support for transparency (alpha channel) in both lossless and lossy modes; support was enabled by default in libwebp 0.2.0 (16 August 2012). According to Google's measurements in November 2011, a conversion from PNG to WebP resulted in a 45% reduction in file size when starting with PNGs found on the Web, and a 28% reduction compared to PNGs that are recompressed with pngcrush and PNGOUT.

In July 2016, Apple added WebP support to early beta versions of macOS Sierra and iOS 10, but support was later removed in the GM seed versions of iOS 10 and macOS Sierra released in September 2016. In September 2020, WebP support was added in Safari version 14.

The supporting libwebp library reached version 1.0 in April 2018.

In November 2024, WebP was formally specified in and published as RFC 9649.

== Technology ==
Simple WebP
Bytes	Content			
0–3	R	I	F	F
4–7	length + 12			
8–11	W	E	B	P
12–15	V	P	8	(space)
16–19	length (padded)			
20–…	VP8 key frame			
pad	? (even length)			

WebP's lossy compression algorithm is based on the intra-frame coding of the VP8 video format and the Resource Interchange File Format (RIFF) as a container format. As such, it is a block-based transformation scheme with eight bits of color depth and a luminance–chrominance model with chroma subsampling by a ratio of 1:2 (YCbCr 4:2:0). Without further content, the mandatory RIFF container has an overhead of only twenty bytes, though it can also hold additional metadata. The side length of WebP images is limited to 16383 pixels.

WebP is based on block prediction. Each block is predicted on the values from the three blocks above it and from one block to the left of it (block decoding is done in raster-scan order: left to right and top to bottom). There are four basic modes of block prediction: horizontal, vertical, DC (one color), and TrueMotion. Mispredicted data and non-predicted blocks are compressed in a 4×4 pixel sub-block with a discrete cosine transform or a Walsh–Hadamard transform. Both transforms are done with fixed-point arithmetic to avoid rounding errors. The output is compressed with entropy encoding. WebP also has explicit support for parallel decoding.

The reference implementation consists of converter software in the form of a command-line program for Linux (cwebp) and a programming library for the decoding, the same as for WebM. The open-source community ported the converter to other platforms, such as Windows.

The WebP container (i.e., RIFF container for WebP) allows feature support over and above the basic use case of WebP (i.e., a file containing a single image encoded as a VP8 key frame). The WebP container provides additional support for:

Metadata
An image may have metadata stored in Exif or XMP formats.
Transparency
An image may have transparency, i.e., an alpha channel.
Color profile
An image may have an embedded ICC profile as described by the International Color Consortium.

=== Lossless compression ===
WebP's lossless compression, a newer algorithm unrelated to VP8, was designed by Google software engineer Jyrki Alakuijala. It uses advanced techniques such as dedicated entropy codes for different color channels, exploiting 2D locality of backward reference distances and a color cache of recently used colors. This complements basic techniques such as dictionary coding, Huffman coding and color indexing transform. This format uses a recursive definition: all of the control images, such as the local entropy code selection, are encoded the same way as the whole image itself.

=== Animation ===
Google has proposed using WebP for animated images as an alternative to the popular GIF format, citing the advantages of 24-bit color with transparency, combining frames with lossy and lossless compression in the same animation, and support for seeking to specific frames. Google reports a 64% reduction in file size for images converted from animated GIFs to lossy WebP, and a 19% reduction for lossless WebP.

== Support ==
=== Web browsers ===
As of 2024, web browsers that support WebP had 96.09% market share.

- Google Chrome and all Chromium-based browsers support WebP. Lossy WebP support was added to Chrome for desktop in version 17 (released February 2012) and lossless WebP support was added in version 23 (released November 2012); lossy and lossless support was added in Google Chrome for Android in version 25 (released March 2013).
- Microsoft Edge versions released after January 2020 are based on the Chromium browser, and have native WebP support. EdgeHTML-based versions of Microsoft Edge support WebP through a platform extension (installed by default) (unless running in the security-hardened "Application Guard" mode, which does not support platform extensions).
- Safari added support for WebP in September 2020 with iOS 14 and macOS Big Sur.
- Mozilla Firefox officially supports WebP since January 2019. It was initially considered for implementation in 2013.
- Pale Moon implemented initial support for WebP in January 2016 with its version 26 milestone.
- SeaMonkey began supporting WebP with its version 2.53.5 released in November 2020.
- GNOME Web, Midori, and Falkon natively support WebP.
- Support for WebP was added to Links in version 2.26.

WebP can also be displayed in all major browsers using the WebPJS JavaScript library, although support in Internet Explorer 6 and above is achieved using Flash.

Google actively promotes WebP. The proprietary PageSpeed Insights tool suggests that webmasters switch from JPEG and PNG to WebP in order to improve their website speed score.

=== Graphics software ===
After WebP was announced in September 2010, software gradually began to support it. By 2011, there were plugins for several popular graphics software programs to support WebP, and some programs such as Acorn and Pixelmator had added native support. Over time, support for the WebP format has grown.

Software	First version with native support	Release date of native support	Notes	Reference
Pixelmator Classic	1.6.2	6 October 2010		
ExifTool	8.34	7 October 2010		
Acorn	2.6	21 October 2010	Export of lossless WebP added in 2022	
ImageMagick	6.6.8-5	14 March 2011		
GraphicConverter	7.2	8 April 2011		
XnView	1.98	9 May 2011		
PaintShop Pro	X4 (14.0)	7 September 2011		
Picasa	3.9	8 December 2011		
IrfanView	4.32	15 December 2011		
GDAL	1.9.0	9 January 2012		
gThumb	3.1.1	23 September 2012		
PhotoLine	18	4 October 2013		
Canvas X	15	20 November 2013		
Krita	2.9.5	10 June 2015	Basic support	
Krita	5.1.0	18 August 2022	Full support	
Aseprite	1.1.1	6 November 2015		
Sketch	41	8 November 2016		
GIMP	2.10	27 April 2018		
FastStone Image Viewer	7.1	28 May 2019	Writing WebP files supported in Version 8.1 (released July 31, 2025)	
Paint.NET	4.2.5	1 October 2019		
Pixelmator Pro	1.6.4	4 June 2020		
Inkscape	1.1	24 May 2021	Export only	
kdenlive	21.04.3	8 July 2021		
Xara Designer Pro+	18.5	24 August 2021		
Adobe Illustrator	26.0	16 October 2021		
Adobe Photoshop	23.2	17 February 2022		
Blender	3.2	8 June 2022		
LibreOffice Draw	7.4	18 August 2022		
Affinity	2.0	9 November 2022		
Shotwell	0.32.0	23 April 2023		
Windows Photos	2023.11050.2013.0	3 May 2023		
CorelDRAW	24.5	18 September 2023		
Clip Studio Paint	3.0.0	14 March 2024		
DaVinci Resolve	20.1	7 August 2025		

In 2019, Google released a free plug-in that enables WebP support in earlier versions of Adobe Photoshop. Free Photoshop plug-ins had been released by Telegraphics and fnordware before that. GIMP up to version 2.8 also supported WebP via a plugin; later, this plugin was shipped in GIMP 2.9 branch, and received multiple improvements. Google has also released a plug-in for Microsoft Windows that enables WebP support in Windows Photo Viewer, Microsoft Office 2010, FastPictureViewer, and any other application that uses Windows Imaging Component.

=== Content management systems ===
Content management system (CMS) support for WebP varies in scope and timing, from uploading and serving WebP files to generating WebP images within the system or converting images to WebP by default.

- Textpattern has supported WebP since version 4.8.5, released on 30 March 2021.
- WordPress added support for uploading WebP images with version 5.8, released on 20 July 2021.
- Drupal can convert images to WebP through image styles since version 9.2, and the image styles shipped with its standard installation profile use WebP by default in new installations since version 10.2.
- TYPO3 has generated WebP images since version 13.0, provided the underlying ImageMagick or GraphicsMagick library supports the format.

=== Other programs ===
FFmpeg linked with the VP8/VP9 reference codec library libvpx can extract VP8 key frames from WebM media and a script can then add the WebP RIFF header and the NUL pad byte for odd frame lengths. Meanwhile, FFmpeg supports libwebp directly.

Gmail and Google Photos both support WebP. Support for WebP is also planned for Google App Engine. The Instant Previews feature of Google Search uses WebP internally to reduce disk space used by previews. Android 4.0 supports encoding and decoding WebP images (via bitmap and Skia). SDL_image supports the format since 1.2.11.

Sumatra PDF supports WebP images for both standalone files and comic books since version 2.4. However, at least up to v3.7.0.0, in EPUB v3.3, it does not yet render WebP images.

Telegram Messenger uses WebP for its Stickers, claiming they are displayed five times faster compared to the other formats usually used in messaging apps.

Signal uses WebP for its non-animated stickers.

LibreOffice supports the import of WebP images since version 7.4, so does the LibreOffice technology based online office Collabora Online.

Godot Engine as of version 4.0 supports importing and exporting WebP images and uses WebP as its internal format for storing imported compressed textures.

Social media services known to natively support WebP in messages include Facebook, Slack, Discord and Element; however, some of these services only support static WebP, and not animated WebP.

== Disadvantages and criticism ==
Like VP8 on which it is based, lossy WebP supports only 8-bit YUV 4:2:0 format, which may cause color loss on images with thin contrast elements (such as in pixel art and computer graphics) and ghosting in anaglyph. Lossless WebP supports VP8L encoding that works exclusively with 8-bit RGBA (red, green, blue, alpha) color space. It has no support for 10-bit color depth, while the successors HEIC and AVIF added 10-bit color depth support.

Due to the complexity of their compression method, WebP files take significantly more time to create than other web image formats. It is therefore not always advisable to process WebP images on demand, for example in the context of Web Map Services.

In October 2013, Josh Aas from Mozilla Research published a comprehensive study of current lossy encoding techniques and was not able to conclude that WebP outperformed JPEG by any significant margin.

== Vulnerability ==
In September 2023, two critical vulnerabilities relating to WebP images were discovered by Apple Security Engineering and Architecture (SEAR) and the Citizen Lab, potentially affecting libwebp itself, Google Chrome and other Chromium-based browsers, as well as any other application using the library.

CVE-2023-4863 was the more actively exploited vulnerability of the two, with a high risk-rating of CVSS 8.8. In applications using the affected library, exploitation of a maliciously crafted .webp lossless file could lead to a buffer overflow, potentially resulting in a denial of service (DoS) or even malicious remote code execution (RCE).

The extensive use of libwebp packages across hundreds of applications, from web browsers to mobile apps, posed a major patching challenge to mitigate the vulnerability, due to the demanding pre-release testing requirements, which highlights the wide-scale implications of this vulnerability.

Several web browsers—including Google Chrome, Firefox, Microsoft Edge, and Brave—issued security patches following the discovery of the vulnerability. The vulnerability was ultimately patched in libwebp version 1.3.2.

== WebP 2 ==
By October 2020, Google had been developing a second version of WebP, plainly named WebP 2, the goal of which was to reach similar compression ratios as AVIF's while remaining faster to encode and decode; its reference implementation is libwebp2.

On 12 October 2022, Google changed the README file in WebP 2's development repository to state "WebP 2 will not be released as an image format" and described the version as a "playground for image compression experiments".

== See also ==
- Comparison of graphics file formats
- AVIF, an image format based on the AV1 video format
- BPG, an image format intended to be a more compression-efficient replacement for the JPEG image format, based on the intra-frame encoding of the High Efficiency Video Coding (HEVC) video compression standard, introduced in 2014.
- FLIF, a discontinued lossless image format which claimed to outperform PNG, lossless WebP, lossless BPG and lossless JPEG2000 in terms of compression ratio, introduced in 2015. FLIF was superseded by JPEG XL.
- HEIF, another image format based on HEVC, now also incorporating AVIF and VVC
- HEIC, an image format based on HEVC, widely used by Apple devices.
- From the Joint Photographic Experts Group:
  - JPEG LS, an old but efficient lossless format, introduced in 1999.
  - JPEG 2000, an improvement intended to replace the older JPEG by the JPEG committee, introduced in 2000.
  - JPEG XR, an alternative to JPEG 2000 supporting HDR and wide gamut color spaces, introduced in 2009.
  - JPEG XL, particularly optimised for responsive web environments, so that content renders well on a wide range of devices. Moreover, it includes several features that help transition from the legacy JPEG format. JPEG XL was introduced at the end of 2020.
- PNG-based animated image formats supporting lossless 24-bit RGB color and 8-bit alpha channel:
  - MNG, Multiple-Image Network Graphics, from PNG Development Group
  - APNG, Animated Portable Network Graphics, from Mozilla Foundation
