= Photos (Windows) =

Built-in image viewer for Windows 8 and later

- Photos in Windows 11 in dark mode
- Developer: Microsoft
- Release: October 26, 2012; 14 years ago
- Stable release: September 2026 Update (2026.11090.22001) / October 6, 2026; 39 days ago
- Operating system: Windows 10, 11; Xbox One+; Discontinued: Windows 8, 8.1 (2023); Xbox 360 (2019)
- Predecessor: Windows Photo Viewer; Windows Photo Gallery; Windows Movie Maker
- Successor: Clipchamp (for video editing)
- Available in: 65 languages
- List of languages: English (United States); English (United Kingdom); Afrikaans; Albanian; Amharic; Arabic; Azerbaijani; Bangla (Bangladesh); Basque; Belarusian; Bulgarian; Catalan; Chinese (Simplified); Chinese (Traditional); Croatian; Czech; Danish; Dutch; Estonian; Filipino; Finnish; French; French (Canada); Galician; German; Greek; Hausa (Latin); Hebrew; Hindi; Hungarian; Icelandic; Indonesian; Italian; Japanese; Kannada; Kazakh; Khmer; Kiswahili; Korean; Lao; Latvian; Lithuanian; Macedonian; Malay; Malayalam; Norwegian (Bokmål); Persian; Polish; Portuguese (Brazil); Portuguese (Portugal); Romanian; Russian; Serbian (Latin, Serbia); Slovak; Slovenian (Slovenia); Spanish (Mexico); Spanish (Spain); Swedish; Tamil; Telugu; Thai; Turkish; Ukrainian; Uzbek; Vietnamese
- Type: Image viewer, image organizer, video editor, video player, raster graphics editor
- License: Freemium – Free base app, with in-app purchases

Microsoft Photos is an image viewer and image organizer developed by Microsoft. It was first included in Windows 8 in 2012 as a functional replacement for Windows Photo Viewer and Windows Photo Gallery. In 2017, it replaced Windows Movie Maker.

In 2024, Photos transitioned from the Universal Windows Platform (UWP) to the Windows App SDK. The app began running in the background at Windows' startup in order to improve the app startup speed, being also integrated into File Explorer's context menu.

== Features ==
=== Photo management ===
Photos is a single-instance app that can organize digital photos and videos in its gallery into albums. The default view is Gallery (previously called Collection in Windows 10), which sorts media by date. Users can also view items by Folder (previously Album) and add items to the existing ones. The folder view shows both auto-generated and user-generated albums. The folder view displays files based on their location in the file system or on OneDrive. Users can choose what folders are displayed and which files are placed in albums. Starting in 2021, the app introduced a filmstrip for easier navigation and a multi-view mode to compare multiple photos and videos side by side. In 2024, Microsoft enhanced the integration between OneDrive and the Photos app, enabling generating shareable links directly from the context menu when selecting a photo or video.

In 2019, Microsoft worked with Apple Inc. to bring the iCloud app to Windows 10. By 2022, Microsoft Photos on Windows 11 was updated to support iCloud Photos integration within its gallery, although still requiring the iCloud app to be installed. In 2024, the iCloud integration was backported to the Windows 10 app.

Between Windows 8 and 10, having Microsoft Photos pinned to the Start menu would automatically trigger a continuous slideshow of gallery images in its tile. Due to battery drainage, the May 2020 Update modified this behavior so the slideshow only activates when the Start menu is opened. Tiles were removed in Windows 11.

Windows 11 2022 Update introduced a Memories tab that automatically organizes media from OneDrive based on date and location, generating themed albums such as Last week through the years or Trip to Tuscany 2021. The 2023 Update reintroduced the timeline scrollbar and improved the slideshow experience, allowing 25 predefined soundtracks to be played during the slideshow. The Windows Explorer-like experience of selecting multiple media by holding down the Shift or Ctrl keys was also added.

Starting in 2024, the Windows 11 app began indexing images stored in OneDrive, automatically identifying content such as car, beach or birthday to make them searchable via the search bar. The update also included the ability to search by location. In 2025, devices with the "Copilot+ PC" branding began having a separate semantic image indexing, enabling the system to extract descriptions like Sunset at the beach from pictures saved locally and integrating them with Windows Search and Photos' search bar.

In 2025, Microsoft Photos introduced optical character recognition (OCR) support, being able to detect text in over 160 languages from a picture and extracting it to the clipboard or sending it to Bing Search. An option was added to show up files located in subfolders inside the Gallery.

=== Photo editing ===
In Windows 8, Photos originally provided the basic raster graphics editor functions: cropping and rotating, correcting exposure or colors, and reducing image noise.

The release of Windows 10 added an editing sidebar capable of adjusting shadows, highlights, sharpness and filters.

In 2023, Microsoft added the Spot Fix feature to the Windows 11 version, capable of cleaning unwanted selected spots from images by blending surrounding pixels. The 2024 Update introduced the first set of AI features: Background Blur and a brush tool to control which areas of an image are blurred or highlighted. The selected background can also be completely removed (leaving an alpha channel) or replaced by a specified color. Spot Fix was renamed Generative Erase, being able to automatically detect objects in a picture and erase them. All features were later backported to the Windows 10 app.

With the release of the Microsoft Designer browser app in early 2024, Microsoft Photos was updated with a "Microsoft Designer" button that would export any picture to the graphic design app. Later that year, the whole Microsoft Designer editing experience was integrated in Microsoft Photos.

Starting in 2025, Copilot+ PCs are able to artificially upscale photos 8x their original size via the neural processing unit (NPU). Copilot+ PCs are also provided with the Relight feature, which allows positioning and controlling three light sources in a picture. A "Copilot" button was added to show AI-generated editing tips, image insights and framing suggestions.

Unlike the classic Windows Photo Gallery, which autosaves edits, Microsoft Photos only saves when a user clicks the Save or Save As button. Photos allows users to compare the original file to the file with unsaved changes, and to save the photo with a different name and location.

=== Media import and export ===
The Photos app's photo and video import tool provides the ability to view and select photos that are automatically grouped by date taken and choose where the files are saved.

Microsoft Photos can print pictures either directly or via an online print service, send them in e-mail or save them to a folder or disc. It supports images in Animated GIF, BMP, JPEG, JPEG XL, JPEG XR (formerly HD Photo), PNG, ICO, PANO, and TIFF file formats. Any picture can also be exported to Microsoft Bing's visual search.

In Windows 11, Photos is compatible with Google's Motion Photo format, which can be a JPEG, HEIC or AVIF file. This type of media allows the user to view a high resolution still image as well as the MP4/MOV video and sound to capture the sentiment and atmosphere where the image was taken.

=== Video Editor ===
With the release of the Fall Creators Update in 2017, Microsoft debuted the Story Remix editor, a suite of video editing tools built into the Photos app and set to replace Windows Movie Maker, which had last been updated in 2012 as part of Windows Essentials. Photos also allowed users to trim, slow down, and save photos from videos.

Later, Story Remix was renamed Video Editor. It was able to organize and transform photos and videos into stories. Video Editor allowed users to create videos from pictures and songs. It also contained features to add 3D effects, soundtracks, 3D animations, and styles to the videos.

In 2021, Microsoft acquired the Clipchamp video editor and started transitioning its video editing tools from Microsoft Photos to Clipchamp, although both coexisted initially.

Windows 11 2022 Update removed Video Editor from the Windows 11 version of Photos, replacing it with Clipchamp.

=== HEVC and HEIF support ===
HEIF Image Extension
- Release: May 8, 2018; 8 years ago
- Stable release: 1.2.65 / November 3, 2026; 11 days ago
- Operating system: Windows 10, 11
- Website: apps.microsoft.com/detail/9pmmsr1cgpwg

HEVC Video Extensions
- Release: May 8, 2018; 8 years ago
- Stable release: 2.4.151 / October 14, 2026; 31 days ago
- Operating system: Windows 10, 11
- Website: apps.microsoft.com/detail/9nmzlz57r3t7

WebP Image Extension
- Release: May 23, 2018; 8 years ago
- Stable release: 1.2.47 / November 12, 2026; 2 days ago
- Operating system: Windows 10, 11
- Website: apps.microsoft.com/detail/9pg2dk419drg

The High Efficiency Video Coding (HEVC) standard was developed as the successor to Advanced Video Coding (AVC), a standard for video coding introduced in 2004. As of December 2024, AVC remains the dominant video format in the industry, with 79% of video developers still relying on it.

While Microsoft was not initially involved in developing the HEVC codec, Nokia had been working on it since 2010. In 2013, following the launch of the Nokia Lumia 920 and prior to Nokia's acquisition, Microsoft revealed a collaboration with Nokia to co-develop a unified codec that would reduce in half the bit rate (i.e. file size) of images and videos when compared to the AVC codec. The initiative aimed to strengthen the competitiveness of Windows Phone against Android and iOS, which wouldn't adopt the standard until 2014 and 2017, respectively. Nonetheless, HEVC was never integrated into Windows Phone.

The efforts made by Nokia were shifted toward the launch of Windows 10 instead. In 2014, Microsoft announced the Windows 10 would include HEVC support, which was officially introduced for MP4 files with the release of the operating system in 2015, but without integrating any app developed by Microsoft. The April 2018 Update brought support for the optional High Efficiency Image File Format (HEIF) container (which includes HEVC as its main codec), allowing HEVC pictures and videos to be displayed and edited in Microsoft Photos and Windows Explorer (File Explorer in Windows 11).

While the HEVC codec was offered for free during the preview builds via Microsoft Store, due to licensing fees imposed by MPEG LA Microsoft began charging USD 0.99 per Microsoft account following the public release of Fall Creators Update in 2017.

=== Raw image support ===
Raw Image Extension
- Release: May 21, 2019; 7 years ago
- Stable release: 2.5.42 / October 16, 2026; 29 days ago
- Operating system: Windows 10, 11
- Website: apps.microsoft.com/detail/9nctdw2w1bh8

JPEG XL Image Extension
- Release: April 12, 2023; 3 years ago
- Stable release: 1.2.68 / November 3, 2026; 11 days ago
- Operating system: Windows 10, 11
- Website: apps.microsoft.com/detail/9mzprth5c0tb

AVC Encoder Video Extension
- Release: January 23, 2024; 2 years ago
- Stable release: 1.1.57 / November 13, 2026; 1 day ago
- Operating system: Windows 10, 11
- Website: apps.microsoft.com/detail/9pb0trcnrhfx

The May 2019 Update introduced support for raw image formats through the optional Raw Image Extension component. Prior to this, thumbnails and metadata from raw files were not visible in either Microsoft Photos or Windows Explorer. Raw Image Extension comes by default on Windows 11.

== History ==
Photos is built from a separate code base from those of Photo Gallery and Windows Photo Viewer. It was first included in Windows 8.0 and had a customizable background and a Facebook photo viewer, both of which were removed in the Windows 8.1 update to the app. It also introduced the ability to view immersive photo PANO files and set a photo as the app's live tile or the Windows lock screen. Like most other apps designed for Windows 8, the controls were hidden until the user right-clicks on the screen.

A screenshot of Microsoft Photos Legacy running on Windows 10

In Windows 10, Photos originally used a hamburger menu for the photo management interface and to make basic controls visible to users. Unlike most Microsoft apps designed specifically for Windows 10, Photos used round buttons like the ones on Windows 8 for editing. Control categories were listed as buttons on the left side of the app, and specific editing options were listed as buttons on the right side of the app. Folder view and the ability for users to edit albums were added to the app after the initial release on Windows 10 in response to user feedback. Photos includes all features from Windows Photo Viewer except the Burn to Disc feature and may gain more features from Photo Gallery in the future. The original view exclusively featured a dark theme.

A major update in October 2016 replaced the hamburger menu with a ribbon, replaced the radial editing tools with an editing sidebar, and added a full-screen view, ink editing for photos and videos, and a light theme.

In 2022, a redesigned version of the Photos app was released for Windows 11 with changes in the user interface matching the design of Windows 11. This version has significantly different photo editing features, including the ability to integrate with iCloud. Many features were removed, including face grouping, searching things, and browsing by year. The former Photos app from Windows 10 has been renamed to Photos Legacy in Windows 11.

An update in October 2026 revamped the app, including app optimizations and new editing tools. A new feature, Relight, was introduced for post-capture lighting and exposure adjustment, along with an AI-powered object removal tool. Photos can now edit HDR, HEIC, and WebP files, and view SVG vector graphics. It also transitioned the app's framework from WinUI 3 to the WebView2 web wrapper, which was criticized by power users.
