= Cloudinary =

American data storage company

Cloudinary Ltd.
- Type: Private
- Industry: Technology
- Founded: 2012
- Founder: Itai Lahan (CEO); Tal Lev-Ami (CTO); Nadav Soferman (CPO)
- Headquarters: San Jose, California, United States
- Area served: Worldwide
- Products: Image and video management
- Number of employees: 325 (Oct 2021)
- Website: cloudinary.com

Cloudinary is a SaaS company providing cloud media management services for websites and apps. The company is headquartered in San Jose, California.

== Background ==
Cloudinary provides a cloud-based platform for managing images and videos used in websites and applications. The platform is used to automate media workflows and support collaboration on digital assets. In 2024, Cloudinary added AI tools to improve image compression and quality across devices and formats. The company also expanded support for the JPEG XL standard, and adopted industry standards such as Content Credentials (C2PA) to address concerns around media authenticity.

== History ==
Cloudinary was founded in 2012 in Israel by Itai Lahan (CEO), Tal Lev-Ami (CTO), and Nadav Soferman (CPO). Cloudinary grew organically, building a profitable SaaS service, without venture capital funding.

In 2015, Cloudinary opened its U.S. headquarters in Palo Alto, California, and added video management to its services. In the same year the company received a secondary investment from Bessemer Venture Partners (BVP), which was BVP's 100th investment in cloud companies.

In 2019, the company moved to Santa Clara, California, and launched tools for responsive image breakpoint generation. The company also collaborated with researchers at Google to create the image format JPEG XL, which improves image compression and rendering.

On 7 April 2020, Cloudinary launched a WordPress plug-in for picture and video processing. In August 2020, Salesforce Ventures invested in Cloudinary.

In 2021, Cloudinary introduced Cloudinary Labs, a division focused on developing new technologies in visual media. Initial projects from the lab include MediaFlows, Media Inspector and ServiceWorker. In the same year, Cloudinary joined the MACH Alliance, a non-profit advocacy group calling for openness in technology ecosystems.

In 2022, Blackstone participated in a secondary investment, a transaction worth more than $100 million and pushed the company's valuation to $2 billion. In the same year, Cloudinary also acquired the software company Indivio for an undisclosed amount. Indivio's products allowed for the creation and delivery of video campaigns.

As of 2022, the company manages more than 50 billion assets for almost 10,000 customers worldwide.

In 2023, company launched its New Ventures initiative, a project focused on using technological advancements and immersive experiences. Cloudinary simultaneously announced Final Touch, the first product produced by the New Ventures initiative.

The company moved into its current San Jose headquarters in 2024.
