= Kakao Entertainment =

South Korean entertainment company

Kakao Entertainment Corp.
- Native name: 주식회사 카카오엔터테인먼트
- Type: Subsidiary
- Industry: Music; entertainment
- Predecessor: KakaoPage Corp.; Kakao M
- Founded: July 20, 2010; 16 years ago (Note: as KakaoPage Co.); March 2, 2021; 5 years ago
- Headquarters: Seongnam, Gyeonggi-do, South Korea
- Area served: Worldwide
- Key people: Ko Jung-hee (Co-CEO); Joseph Chang (Co-CEO)
- Services: Music production, publishing, and distribution; Event organization, IP, and technological platform
- Revenue: ▼ ₩1.19 trillion (US$889.37 million) (2025)
- Net income: ▼ ₩63.47 billion (US$47.36 million) (2025)
- Total assets: ▼ ₩2.46 trillion (US$1.84 billion) (2025)
- Total equity: ▼ ₩1 trillion (US$749.1 million) (2025)
- Owner: Kakao (63.50%); Podo Asia B.V. (15.33%); Others (21.17%)
- Parent: Kakao
- Divisions: Page Company; M Company
- Subsidiaries: See subsidiaries
- Website: KakaoEnt.com

Kakao Entertainment Corp. (Korean: 주식회사 카카오엔터테인먼트) is a South Korean entertainment, mass media, and publishing company founded in 2021. A subsidiary of the Internet company Kakao, it was established subsequent to the merger of the latter's two subsidiaries KakaoPage and Kakao M.

== History ==
=== KakaoPage Corp. ===
Podotree Co, Ltd. was founded on July 20, 2010, as a subsidiary of Kakao, and launched KakaoPage three years later. On August 1, 2018, the company changed its corporate name to KakaoPage Corp.

=== Kakao M ===
Seoul Records, Inc. was founded in October 1978 by Min Young-bin, founder of the South Korean educational company YBM Group, formerly known as Sisa English. In 2005, SK Telecom acquired the company and relaunched it as LOEN Entertainment, Inc. in 2008. LOEN was subsequently sold to Star Invest Holdings, a subsidiary of Affinity Equity Partners.

In January 2016, Kakao acquired the company, which was renamed Kakao M Corp. in December 2017.

In October 2020, the company established a subsidiary in Thailand, Kakao M Asia (Private) Co., Ltd., which was later renamed Kakao Entertainment Asia Co., Ltd..

=== Merger as Kakao Entertainment (2021–present) and reorganisation ===
In December 2020, Kakao was reported to be considering a merger of its subsidiaries Kakao Page and Kakao M ahead of Kakao Page's planned initial public offering (IPO). The merger would bring Kakao's webtoon, web novel, music and video businesses under one company and strengthen its content portfolio. In January 2021, the boards of both companies approved the merger, which was completed on March 1, establishing Kakao Entertainment.

In May 2021, Kakao Entertainment agreed to acquire Radish, a U.S.-based serialized-fiction platform, for approximately US$440 million. The acquisition was part of the company's expansion into the North American market.

In July, Kakao Entertainment and Melon Company approved a merger, which was completed on September 1 following shareholder approval. Melon subsequently became a company-in-company (CIC) within Kakao Entertainment, with Lee Je-wook appointed to lead its operations.

In September, Kakao Entertainment announced that its music-label subsidiaries Play M Entertainment and Cre.ker Entertainment would merge to form IST Entertainment. The merger brought their artists and production operations together under Kakao Entertainment's multi-label system and was scheduled for completion by the end of the year.

In January 2023, Kakao Entertainment secured an investment of ₩1.2 trillion (US$895.34 million) from sovereign wealth funds associated with Saudi Arabia and Singapore. The deal was described as one of the largest overseas investments in a South Korean content company at the time. The funds reportedly included contributions of ₩600 billion (US$447.67 million) each from Saudi Arabia's Public Investment Fund and Singapore's Government of Singapore Investment Corporation (GIC). Kakao's initial announcement did not identify the investors.

In 2025, Kakao Entertainment began selling several subsidiaries and content platforms as it sought to reduce losses and improve its financial position. In February, it sold Next Level Studio, a webtoon and web novel platform acquired in 2022, to an unidentified South Korean content company. It also sold IST Entertainment to Beyond Music for ₩26.7 billion (US$19.92 million) and disposed of its 50.07% stake in 3Y Corporation for ₩8.7 billion (US$6.49 million). The company also began winding down its North American digital content businesses, including Tapas Media and Radish Fiction. These moves followed a period of rapid expansion through acquisitions, during which Kakao Entertainment's number of subsidiaries increased from 14 in 2020 to 53 in 2022.

The restructuring prompted speculation that Kakao Entertainment might revive its IPO plans. However, Kakao Corporation subsequently explored selling a majority stake in the company instead of pursuing a public listing. According to reports, Kakao outlined the proposed sale in a letter to major financial investors, citing declining stock market valuations. Potential buyers reportedly included gaming companies, entertainment groups and private equity firms. Kakao had previously considered a Nasdaq listing for Kakao Entertainment, while plans for a domestic IPO had remained on hold since 2021.

In July 2026, private equity firm Anchor Equity Partners began seeking to sell its stake in Kakao Entertainment after the company's IPO plans stalled and an attempted sale failed to produce a deal. Anchor also pursued refinancing for a loan secured against its investment, which was due to mature at the end of the year. The discussions, coordinated by JB Woori Capital, took place amid rising borrowing costs and limited opportunities to exit the investment.

In September, Kakao Entertainment announced plans to close Tapas, following the shutdown of Radish in 2025. The company had acquired both platforms in 2021 for a combined amount of approximately ₩1.1 trillion (US$820.73 million). Tapas had recorded a goodwill impairment of ₩46 billion (US$34.32 million) in 2023. Kakao Entertainment planned to consolidate its webtoon and web novel services around KakaoPage by the end of 2026. The move shifted its focus towards its existing intellectual property and partnerships with established overseas platforms, including Piccoma in Japan, rather than maintaining its own operations in those markets. The restructuring coincided with Kakao's proposed 2027 corporate split into Kakao AI and Kakao X. Kakao Entertainment was expected to become part of Kakao X, alongside other entertainment and investment businesses, as part of the planned reorganisation.

In October, Kakao Entertainment entered into a strategic partnership with Atlantic Music Group, a subsidiary of Warner Music Group, to develop K-pop artists and expand their international presence. The companies did not disclose the financial terms of the agreement or identify the artists involved.

Later that month, Kakao Corporation was reported to be considering transferring its 21.61% stake in SM Entertainment to Kakao Entertainment as part of a broader reorganisation of its entertainment holdings. Kakao Entertainment already owned 19.89% of SM Entertainment. If the proposed transfer went ahead, its combined stake would increase to approximately 41.5%.

== Divisions ==
=== Page Company ===
Headed by co-CEO Joy Lee, the Kakao Entertainment's Page Company is in charge of the company's web fiction publishing and web development business. It is situated in Pangyo, Seongnam in Gyeonggi Province.

=== M Company ===
Headed by co-CEO Stephan Kim, the Kakao Entertainment's M Company is in charge of the company's entertainment and mass media business. Its headquarters is in Teheran-ro, Gangnam-gu in Seoul.

== Subsidiaries ==
=== Under the Page Company ===
- AdPage (Note: joint venture with Kakao Games)
- Daon Creative
- KW Books
- Kiwi Vine
- RS Media
- Radish Media
- Samyang C&C
- Soundist Entertainment
- Tapas Media
- Yeondam

=== Under the M Company ===
==== Entertainment companies ====
- Antenna Music
- EDAM Entertainment
- High Up Entertainment
- Starship Entertainment
  - Starship X
  - Highline Entertainment

==== Talent companies ====
- Awesome ENT
- BH Entertainment
- J.Wide Company
- King Kong by Starship
- Management SOOP
- Ready Entertainment
- VAST Entertainment & Media

==== Production companies ====
- 3Y Corporation
- Baram Pictures
- Dolphiners Films
- GRAYGO
  - Maison de Baja
- Kross Pictures
- Logos Film
- Mega Monster
- Moonlight Film
- ootb Studio
- Sanai Pictures
- Shownote
- Story & Pictures Media
- Studio K11O
- Zip Cinema

== Assets ==
=== Buildings ===
- Jungsuck Building (Seoul) - headquarters of the Kakao Entertainment M Company
- The Kakao Entertainment M Company also owns a building at Samseong-dong in Seoul, where the headquarters of IST Entertainment and Flex M are located.

=== Internet properties ===
- 1theK
  - 1theK Live
  - 1theK Originals
  - 1theK Style (coming soon)
- Berriz
- KakaoPage
  - KakaoPage Indonesia (formerly Neobazar) (Indonesia)
- KakaoTV
- Kakao Webtoon
  - Kakao Webtoon (South Korea) (formerly Daum Webtoon)
  - Kakao Webtoon (Indonesia)
  - Kakao Webtoon (Taiwan)
  - Kakao Webtoon (Thailand)
- Melon
- Muse (mobile audition application)
- Radish (US)
  - Wuxiaworld (US)
- Tapas (US)

== Works ==
=== Filmography ===
==== TV and web series ====
Drama credits of Kakao Entertainment and its subsidiaries
Year	Title		Network	Credited as			Ref.
Year	English	Korean/Other language	Network	Screenwriter	Director	Producer	Ref.
2021	Dr. Brain	Dr. 브레인	Apple TV+	Kim Jin-a; Koh Young-jae; Lee Moo-so; Kim Jee-woon	Kim Jee-woon (Note: Adaptation of Dr. Brain by Hongjacga)	Kakao Entertainment; Bound Entertainment; Dark Circle Pictures; StudioPlex	
2022	Business Proposal	사내맞선	SBS TV	Han Seol-hee; Hong Bo-hee	Park Seon-ho (Note: Adaptation of The Office Blind Date by HaeHwa)	Kakao Entertainment; Kross Pictures	
2022	Roppongi Class	六本木クラス / 롯폰기 클라쓰	TV Asahi	Koji Tokuo (Note: Adaptation of Itaewon Class by Jo Kwang-jin)	Naomi Tamura; Naomi Kinoshita	Kakao Entertainment; Kross Pictures; TV Asahi; SLL; As Birds	
2023	The Worst of Evil	최악의 악	Disney+	Jang Min-suk	Han Dong-wook	Kakao Entertainment; Baram Pictures; Sanai Pictures	
2023	Castaway Diva	무인도의 디바	tvN	Park Hye-ryun; Eun Yeol	Oh Chung-hwan	Kakao Entertainment; Baram Pictures	
2023-2024	Gyeongseong Creature	경성크리처	Netflix	Kang Eun-kyung	Chung Dong-yoon; Roh Young-sub; Jo Young-min	Kakao Entertainment; Story & Pictures Media; Studio Dragon	
2025	Secret Relationships	비밀사이	Watcha; Heavenly	Lee Yoo-jin (Note: Adaptation of Secret Relationships by McQueen Studio)	Yang Kyung-hee	Kakao Entertainment; Playlist Studio; Fuji Television	
2025	Karma	악연	Netflix	Lee Il-hyung (Note: Adaptation of Karma by Choi Hee-seon)	Lee Il-hyung	Kakao Entertainment; Baram Pictures; Moonlight Film	
2025	Crushology 101	바니와 오빠들	MBC TV	Sung So-eun; Lee Sul	Kim Ji-hoon (Note: Adaptation of Bunny and Her Boys by Nieun)	Kakao Entertainment	
2025	Nine Puzzles	나인 퍼즐	Disney+	Lee Eun-mi	Yoon Jong-bin; Kim Jung-ho	Kakao Entertainment; Moonlight Film	
2025	You and Everything Else	은중과 상연	Netflix	Song Hye-jin	Jo Young-min	Kakao Entertainment	
2026	Boyfriend on Demand	월간남친	Netflix	Namgung Do-young	Kim Jung-sik	Kakao Entertainment; Baram Pictures; WhyNot Media	
2026	Still Shining	샤이닝	JTBC	Lee Sook-yeon	Kim Yoon-jin	Kakao Entertainment; SLL JoongAng	
2026	Perfect Crown	21세기 대군 부인	MBC TV	Yoo Ah-in	Park Joon-hwa; Bae Hee-young	Kakao Entertainment; Munhwa Broadcasting Corporation	
2026	The Wonderfools	원더풀스	Netflix	Heo Da-joong	Yoo In-sik	Kakao Entertainment; Fantagio; Nangmancrew	
TBA	Solo Leveling (Note: Adaptation of Solo Leveling by Chugong)	나 혼자만 레벨업	Netflix	Lee Hae-jun; Kim Byung-seo; Kang San	Lee Hae-jun; Kim Byung-seo	Kakao Entertainment; Sanai Pictures	

===== Baram Pictures =====
Drama credits of Baram Pictures
Year	Title		Network	Credited as			Ref.
Year	English	Korean/Other language	Network	Screenwriter	Director	Producer	Ref.
2021	Kingdom: Ashin of the North	킹덤: 아신전	Netflix	Kim Eun-hee (Note: Adaptation of The Kingdom of the Gods by Kim Eun-hee and Yang Kyung-il)	Kim Seong-hun	Baram Pictures; Studio Dragon; B.A. Entertainment	
2021	Jirisan	지리산	tvN	Kim Eun-hee	Lee Eung-bok	Baram Pictures; Studio Dragon; AStory	
2022	Behind Every Star (Note: Korean adaptation of the French TV series Call My Agent! (Dix pour cent))	연예인 매니저로 살아남기	tvN	Park So-young; Lee Chan	Baek Seung-ryong	Baram Pictures; Studio Dragon	
2023	Race	레이스	Disney+	Kim Ru-ri	Lee Dong-yoon; Han Jin-sun	Baram Pictures; Slingshot Studios	
2023	Not Others	남남	Genie TV; ENA	Min Seon-ae (Note: Adaptation of Strangers by Jung Young-rong)	Lee Min-woo	Baram Pictures; SYN&studio (formerly Arc Media)	
2023	Song of the Bandits	도적: 칼의 소리	Netflix	Han Jung-hoon	Hwang Jun-hyeok; Park Hyun-suk	Baram Pictures; Studio Dragon; Urban Works Media	
2024	When the Phone Rings	지금 거신 전화는	MBC TV	Kim Ji-woon (Note: Adaptation of The Number You Have Dialed by Geoneomulnyeo)	Park Sang-woo; Wi Deuk-gyu	Baram Pictures; Bon Factory	
2025	When Life Gives You Tangerines	폭싹 속았수다	Netflix	Lim Sang-choon	Kim Won-seok	Baram Pictures; Pan Entertainment	
2025	Walking on Thin Ice	은수 좋은 날	KBS 2TV	Jeon Young-shin	Song Hyun-wook	Baram Pictures; Slingshot Studios	

===== Moonlight Film =====
Drama credits of Moonlight Film
Year	Title		Network	Credited as			Ref.
Year	English	Korean/Other language	Network	Screenwriter	Director	Producer	Ref.
2022	Narco-Saints	수리남	Netflix	Yoon Jong-bin; Kwon Sung-hui	Yoon Jong-bin	Moonlight Film; Perfect Storm Film	

===== Sanai Pictures =====
Drama credits of Sanai Pictures
Year	Title		Network	Credited as			Ref.
Year	English	Korean/Other language	Network	Screenwriter	Director	Producer	Ref.
2024	Gangnam B-Side	강남 비-사이드	Disney+	Joo Won-gyu; Park Noo-ri	Park Noo-ri	Sanai Pictures; Plus M Entertainment; Story Rooftop	

== Locations ==
- Kakao Entertainment Page Company: Twosun World Building 8/F, 221, Pangyoyeok-ro, Bundang-gu, Seongnam-si, Gyeonggi-do, South Korea
- Kakao Entertainment M Company: Jungsuck Building, 17, Teheran-ro 103-gil, Gangnam-gu, Seoul, South Korea

== Extra info ==
- Tachiyomi, A free and open-source Manga, Manhwa etc. reader app, was forced to stop development after Kakao Entertainment issued a cease-and-desist letter to the developers.
- ReaperScan, A free and fan translated Manhwa and Web Novel site, was forced to shutdown after Kakao Entertainment issued a cease-and-desist letter to the site admin.
- Kotatsu, a free and open-source manga reader for Android, announced its shutdown in November 2025, following "threatening actions" from Kakao Entertainment and changes to Google's sideloading policies.
