= Tachiyomi =

Manga and comic reader app for Android devices

- Original author: Inorichi
- Initial release: 2014
- Stable release: 0.15.3 / 13 January 2024
- Written in: Kotlin
- Operating system: Android
- Type: Manga Reader
- License: Apache-2.0 License
- Website: tachiyomi.org
- Repository: github.com/tachiyomiorg/tachiyomi

Tachiyomi was a free and open-source manga and comic reader application for Android devices. It was developed by Inorichi and released in 2014. The name "Tachiyomi" is derived from the Japanese word "tachiyomi" (立ち読み), meaning standing and reading, often in a bookstore.

== Features ==
Tachiyomi offered a range of features. It supported multiple source extensions, allowing users to access manga from various online platforms. Users could create customizable libraries to organize their manga collection based on genres, authors, or reading progress. The application provided different reading modes, including single-page, double-page, and long-strip scrolling. Users could customize the app's appearance, layout, and reading controls. Tachiyomi allowed users to download manga chapters for offline reading. Integration with tracking services such as MyAnimeList enabled users to track their reading progress and synchronize data across multiple devices.

== Development ==
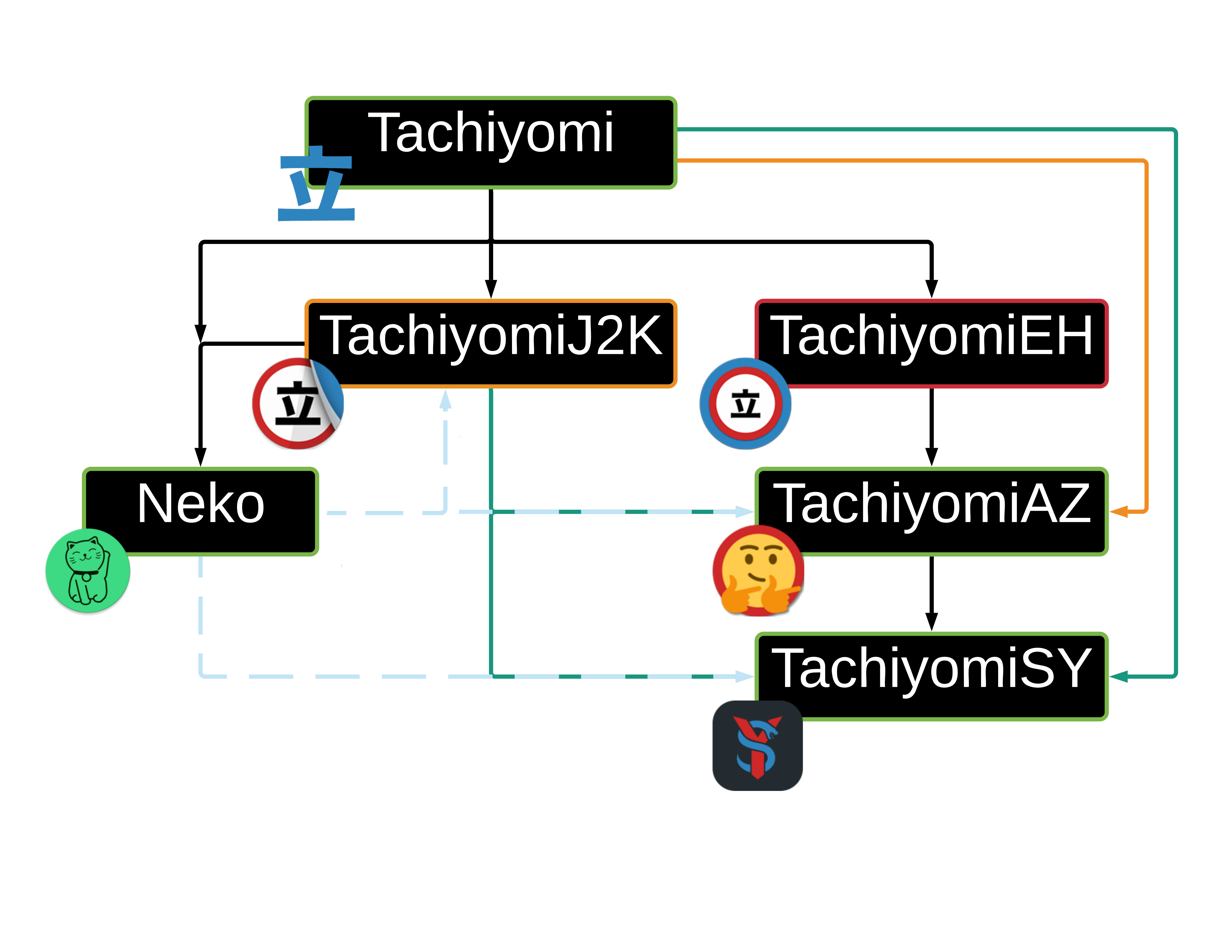
Forks of Tachiyomi

Tachiyomi was an open-source project hosted on GitHub, allowing developers to contribute to its development and improvement. Due to its open-source nature, Tachiyomi has many specialized forks.

== Cease and desist from Kakao Entertainment ==
In January 2024, the developers of Tachiyomi received a cease and desist letter from a South Korean company Kakao Entertainment, demanding them to destroy the project and all of its forks. In response of the demands, the project's core developers have announced that the core version of the app will not be under active development and the project's repositories will be removed, following the cessation of providing source extensions for the app.

Multiple open-source developer teams have aimed to 'take up the mantle' and create successor apps following the cease and desist, such as Mihon.
