= Clipping path =

Closed vector path, or shape

A clipping path (or "deep etch") is a closed vector path, or shape, used to cut out a 2D image in image editing software. Anything inside the path will be included after the clipping path is applied; anything outside the path will be omitted from the output. Applying the clipping path results in a hard (aliased) or soft (anti-aliased) edge, depending on the image editor's capabilities

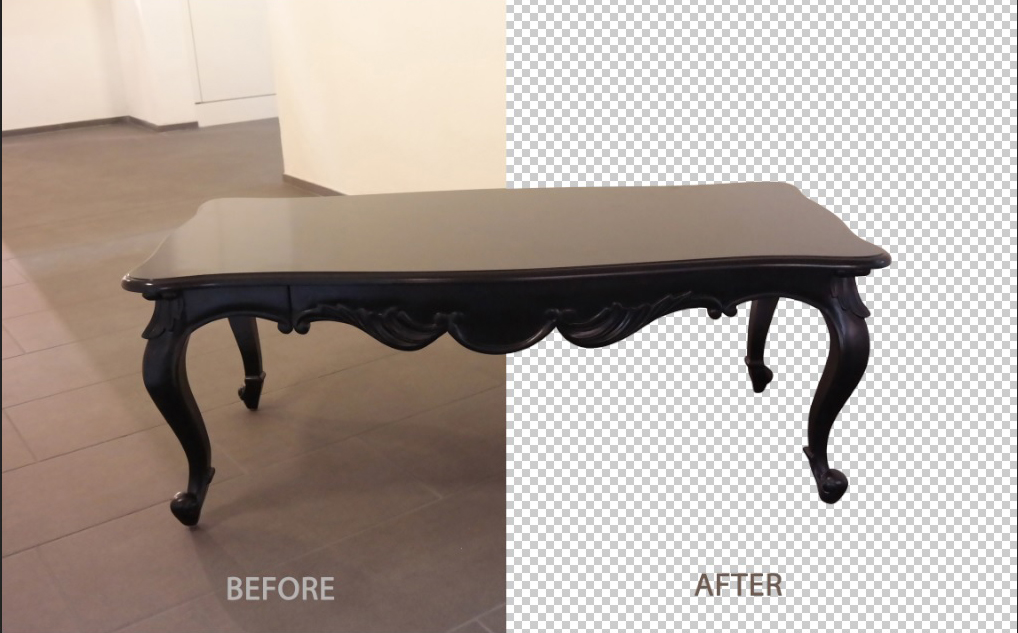
Clipping path

By convention, the inside of the path is defined by its direction. Reversing the direction of a path reverses what is considered inside or outside. An inclusive path is one where what is visually "inside" the path corresponds to what will be preserved; an exclusive path, of opposite direction, contains what is visually "outside" the path. By convention, a clockwise path that is non-self-intersecting is considered inclusive.

A compound path results from the combination of multiple paths (inclusive and exclusive) and the Boolean operations that ultimately determine what the combined path contains. For instance, an inclusive path which contains a smaller exclusive path results in a shape with a "hole" (defined by the exclusive path).

One common use of a clipping path is to cull objects that do not need to be rendered because they are outside the user's viewport or obscured by display elements (such as a HUD).

== In 3D graphics ==
Clipping planes are used in 3D computer graphics in order to prevent the renderer from calculating surfaces at an extreme distance from the viewer. The plane is perpendicular to the camera, a set distance away (the threshold), and occupies the entire viewport. Used in real-time rendering, clipping planes can help preserve processing for objects within clear sight.

The use of clipping planes can result in a detraction from the realism of a scene, as the viewer may notice that everything at the threshold is not rendered correctly or seems to (dis)appear spontaneously. The addition of fog—a variably transparent region of color or texture just before the clipping plane—can help soften the transition between what should be in plain sight and opaque, and what should be beyond notice and fully transparent, and therefore does not need to be rendered.

== Clipping path service ==
Clipping path services are professional offerings provided by companies for extracting objects or people from still imagery, and typically includes other photo editing and manipulation services. Addressees of such services are primarily photography and graphic design studios, advertising agencies, web designers, as well as lithographers and printing companies. Clipping path service companies commonly reside in developing countries such as Bangladesh, Philippine, India, Pakistan and Nepal, which can provide their services at comparatively low cost to developed countries, fostering outsourcing of such activities.

== See also ==
- Silhouette
