= Icon design =

Genre of graphic design

DOT pictogram for an elevator. Such icons are often used in airports, train stations and hotels.

Icon design is the process of designing graphic symbols to represent physical objects (pictograms) and abstract concepts (ideograms). In the context of software applications, an icon often represents a program, an action, or data on a computer.

== Usage and process ==
Though the design of icons has existed as long as pictograms and ideograms have, modern icon design primarily exists in maps, public infrastructure like wayfinding, and user interfaces for video games, computers, and mobile devices. Physical venues and events make use of either existing symbols from governments (such as the DOT pictograms) or custom icon designs. Custom icons are most visible as application icons, favicons, and user interface toolbar icons on computers and mobile devices.

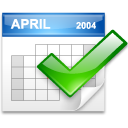
Icon for a calendar app

Modern app icons have a maximum size of 1024×1024 pixels or greater, however icon design involves creating artwork at various sizes for legibility. At smaller sizes, designers often eliminate or reduce unnecessary details while exaggerating important details. Especially for lower-density displays, icons are hinted at various sizes similar to digital type design by aligning shapes to pixel boundaries as to ensure visual clarity. Icons may also need to be altered for different display modes, such as dark mode. The design of icon sets includes consideration to a shared elements, such as a color palette, perspective, and style.

The process of icon design includes defining a metaphor, drawing an illustration, creating any necessary alterations for various sizes, and occasionally assembling files into a folder, ICO file, or ICNS file. Vector icons in apps and websites are usually SVG files.

Due to their high visibility and relation to logo design and branding, new app icons are frequently criticized.

== Notable icon designers ==
- Masaru Katsumi – 1964 Summer Olympics in Tokyo
- Lance Wyman – 1968 Summer Olympics in Mexico City, National Zoo
- Rajie Cook & Dan Shanosky – USDOT pictograms
- Otto Aicher – 1972 Summer Olympics in Munich
- Susan Kare – Classic Mac OS, Facebook gifts
- Jon Hicks – Firefox, Skype emoticons, Icon Handbook
- The Iconfactory - Windows XP, Windows Vista, Twitter emoji

== See also ==
- Icon (computing) § Icon creation
- Skeuomorph
