= Axialis IconWorkshop =

IconWorkshop
- Developer(s): Axialis Software
- Stable release: 6.9.1 / June 2016; 8 years ago
- Operating system: Windows Vista; Windows 7 Windows 8 Windows 8.1; Windows 10; Windows 11
- Size: 37 MB
- Available in: English, French and German
- Type: Icon editor
- Website: www.axialis.com/iconworkshop/

Axialis IconWorkshop is an icon editor developed by Axialis Software. IconWorkshop can create icons for Windows (.ico), Macintosh (.icns) and UNIX-like systems (.png). IconWorkshop includes a library of objects that can be put together to create many different styles of icons. The utility supports plugins and allows importing graphics directly from Photoshop and Illustrator.

Software developers can edit icons directly in image strips. These images are used to populate button icons in application toolbars. Since version 6.50, the user can create and edit raster images directly without using the icon image export feature.

The product is cited in an article from Microsoft Windows User Experience Interaction Guidelines about Windows Vista icon creation. Axialis Software in association with Microsoft offers a free version called IconWorkshop Lite. This version is available to registered users of Visual Studio 2008 Standard or above.

Clubic reviewed the application, giving it 4.5 stars out of 5, saying that "it allows doing everything with icons, and its tools are easily accessible which makes the software intuitive". IconWorkshop has been nominated in the category "Best Graphics Program or Utility" at the 2005 Shareware Industry Awards.

== See also ==
- List of icon software
