= Fast forward =

Playback function of a recording

The icon matching fast forward in the open-source font Font Awesome

To fast-forward is to move forwards through a recording at a speed faster than that at which it would usually be played, for example two times or two point five times. The recordings are usually audio, video or computer data. It is colloquially known as 'f-forwarding'. On media control symbols, such as player buttons and interfaces, the function is commonly represented by two solid arrows pointing right and these typical icons were correctly recognised by 75% of a sample of European consumers. This symbol is represented in Unicode as U+23E9 ⏩ BLACK RIGHT-POINTING DOUBLE TRIANGLE.

== Usage in audio ==
A VHS tape and player mechanism, showing the tape path in different modes.

To reach a certain portion of a song, a person may fast-forward through a cassette tape by pressing a button (often labeled "Fast Forward" itself) on the tape deck containing the tape. The tape deck's motor activates at a speed higher than usual—for example, double the standard 1 7/8-inch-per-second (48 mm/s) playing speed of the 1/8-inch (3.2 mm) cassette tape—and can be stopped by the end of the tape, the pressing of a "Stop" button on the deck (or another button mechanism disengaging the button), or simply lifting a finger from the "Fast Forward" button.

Fast-forwarding is the exact opposite of rewinding, in which tape, music, etc., are moved backward at a user's discretion. In either operation, because of sound distortion, volume is usually muted or severely reduced.

With the advent of inexpensive digital music media, fast-forwarding has most likely lost its past meaning related to the speed of a tape deck motor (or record turntable, or another device allowing fast-forwarding) and now may, especially as cassette tapes and other analogue media are used less and less by younger generations, only apply to the operation of moving ahead in a recording's time frame—accomplished today by simple clicking, dragging a slide image, or even via speech-recognition software. (Still, some CD and DVD players offer tape-style fast-forwarding, so that the user can detect when the destination is reached and stop.)

== Usage in video ==
Analogue VCRs provided fast-forward by simply playing the tape faster. The resulting loss of synchronization of the video was accepted because it was still possible to make out approximately what was happening in the video to find the desired playback point. Modern digital video systems such as DVR and Video on Demand systems use 'trick mode' to present an apparently faster stream by only displaying selected frames.

Unlike analogue video streams in which only serial access is possible, digital video allows for random access to the media, which raises the possibility of alternative fast forwarding algorithms and visualizations. In video streaming formats, such as H.264, fast forward algorithms use the I-frames to sample the video at faster than normal speed. In streaming videos, fast-forward represents a useful search or browsing mechanism, but introduces extra network overhead when non-I-frames are transmitted in addition to the viewed I-frames and extra computational complexity in the video transcoder. Finding more network bandwidth-conserving and computationally efficient algorithms for accommodating both fast-forward and normal speed viewing is an active area of research.

When fast-forwarding is used as a search mechanism (sometimes called a fast-forward video surrogate) in video libraries, the question arises as to what is perceptually the best fast-forward strategy for effective browsing. The main trade-off is between the fast-forward speed and the ability to understand the video. One study concluded that a 1:64 ratio surrogate (that is, show one frame out of every 64) allowed most participants to perform adequately on a range of tasks related to video understanding.

== Metaphorical uses ==
Fast-forwarding videotapes and similar media is familiar enough for metaphorical uses to develop, e.g. "The court doesn't want to know about your aunt's bad hip. Fast-forward to when the fight started."
