= IconBuilder =

Adobe Photoshop plugin

- Developer: The Iconfactory
- Stable release: 8.5.3 / December 2, 2011; 14 years ago
- Operating system: Mac OS X 10.4, 2000, XP, Vista, 7, 8
- Platform: Photoshop, Elements or Fireworks
- Type: icon editor plugin
- License: Commercial, $79
- Website: iconfactory.com/software/iconbuilder

IconBuilder was a popular plugin for Adobe softwares such as: Adobe Photoshop, Adobe Photoshop Elements and Macromedia Fireworks for the editing and creation of computer icons created and used by The Iconfactory. It supports all icon sizes for both Mac OS X and Microsoft Windows. IconBuilder was created when there was no official tool from Apple Computer for making icons in the .icns format introduced by Mac OS 8.5.

The Windows version is at version 2.0, lagging far behind the Macintosh version. The Mac OS 9 version is frozen at 3.1. Version 8 adds support for Windows Vista's 256×256 icons.

== Features ==
- Create icons of any size, up to 1,024×1,024 pixels.
- Supports Mac OS X icon drop state.
- Export to multiple file formats simultaneously.
- Import existing icons.
- File integrity checks.

== See also ==
- Icon editor
- Favicon
