= CandyBar =

Mac OS X icon application

- CandyBar 3.0 running on Mac OS X 10.5.1
- Developer(s): Panic and The Iconfactory
- Stable release: 3.3.4 / August 3, 2012; 12 years ago
- Operating system: OS X
- Type: System utility
- License: Shareware
- Website: www.panic.com/candybar

CandyBar is an unsupported OS X application by Panic and The Iconfactory. Although macOS allows users to change icons for user-level files and folders, this is not possible for system files. The application replaces system icons with icons/docks of the user's choice and supports cataloging of icons. New icons and docks were available also from the Iconfactory website. CandyBar is the successor to The Iconfactory's iControl program for Mac OS 8 and Mac OS 9.

Panic announced in August 2012 that the application would no longer be supported, and offered it as a free download instead. Further commercial development of CandyBar was hindered by changes in the macOS, it was harder to replace icons with every new version and new icons could cause problems with update of several Mac App Store applications. The final release of CandyBar runs on OS X Mountain Lion. The company also had provided a serial number on its website. The application was fully handed over to The Iconfactory, which released a 2022 update removing the ability to modify system icons, but retaining the icon organization features.
