= IcoFX =

- Developer: IcoFX Software
- Stable release: 3.9 / October 3, 2023; 2 years ago
- Written in: Delphi
- Operating system: Microsoft Windows
- Size: 16.4 MB
- License: Trialware
- Website: icofx.ro

IcoFX is an icon creation software package for Microsoft Windows. Previously released as freeware, it allows editing multiple formats of icons with support for transparency. Icons can also be converted from one format to another, for instance from a Macintosh icon to a Windows icon. Users may easily import any image and convert it to an icon. Version 1.6.4 was the last freeware-release of IcoFX. The creator of IcoFX, Attila Kovrig, also developed an animated cursor editor called AniFX in 2008. AniFX's development was discontinued after its features were integrated into IcoFX 2.0.
