= Twitterrific =

Twitter client

- Developer: The Iconfactory
- Initial release: January 15, 2007
- Final release: 5.3.9 (macOS); 6.2 (iOS) / February 2, 2019; 7 years ago (Mac OS X); June 30, 2020; 5 years ago (iOS)
- Operating system: macOS, iOS
- Platform: Macintosh (PowerPC & x86), iPhone, iPad, & iPod Touch (ARM)
- Available in: English
- Type: Twitter client
- License: Paid (lifetime) (Mac OS X); Freemium (subscription and lifetime options available) (iOS)
- Website: twitterrific.com

Twitterrific was a macOS and iOS client for the social networking site Twitter created by The Iconfactory and was the first Twitter desktop client to come to macOS. It lets users view "tweets" or micro-blog posts on the Twitter website in real time as well as publish their own. Twitterrific is closed source software.

== Features ==
The program's main window uses a translucent black theme similar to certain palettes used in Aperture, iPhoto and other Apple Inc. software. Users may choose to view the full public timeline or just the friends feed. Users can also click on links to view the poster's profile or mark a tweet as a favorite.

Twitterrific also provides functionality to upload images and videos for posting on Twitter.

== History ==
As of version 2.1, Twitterrific supports Growl notifications, enhanced AppleScript capabilities and can be used with other sites or services that use the Twitter API.

Version 3 changed Twitterrific into advertising supported shareware; every hour an ad is refreshed to the top of the list. Users who buy the program receive no ads. Other changes in version 3 mostly added compatibility with Mac OS X 10.5 and incorporated newer Twitter features like direct messaging.

The iOS version of Twitterrific won the 2008 Apple Design Award for Best iPhone Social Networking Application.

On April 1, 2010, The Iconfactory released Twitterrific for iPad (Version 1.0), ready for the iPad's US launch on April 3. On June 24, a version of Twitterrific was launched (version 3.0) that was universally compatible with the iPhone, iPod touch and the iPad.

On February 14, 2017, a Kickstarter project was launched by The Iconfactory to try and revive the Twitterrific for Mac application.

On October 10, 2017, the Mac application received a 5.0 update and was added to the Mac App Store.

On June 13, 2019, the iOS version 6.0 was announced. It disregarded previous in-app purchases. Users who had previously paid not to see ads were shown ads again. Iconfactory regards Twitterrific 6.0 as a new app but does not give their existing users the option of staying on Twitterific 5.x.

Twitterrific was discontinued on January 19, 2023, when Twitter cut off access to the Twitter API for most 3rd party clients, thus breaking the MacOS and iOS apps.

== Influence on Twitter ==
Twitterrific is credited with introducing the word "tweet" to refer to a Twitter post; Twitter had previously used the word "twittering". Twitter also only adopted a blue bird logo after Twitterrific had introduced a similar logo.
