= IEEE 1621 =

Standard on power states

IEEE 1621 ("Standard for User Interface Elements in Power Control of Electronic Devices Employed in Office/Consumer Environments") is a standard published by the IEEE and approved by ANSI that describes human interface guidelines regarding power controls in consumer electronics. It includes terminology, icons, and lighting. It also standardized the crescent moon (⏾) as a sleep symbol. IEEE 1621 references the following standards: ANSI/VITA 40, CIE 107, IEC 60073, IEC 60417, IEC 60447, IEC 62301, IEC 80416-1, IEC 80416-3, ISO 7000, ISO 9186, ISO 9241-1, ISO 9241-10, and ISO/IEC 13251.

== History and Motivation ==
Standardization of power controls in consumer electronics was spearheaded by Bruce Nordman at Lawrence Berkeley National Laboratory with funding provided by the California Energy Commission Public Interest Energy Research Program. Nordman's research showed that many computers had power saving features disabled, mainly due to consumer confusion due to the lack of standardization of terminology and symbols in both hardware and software. Confusion was further compounded due the symbol IEC 60417-5009 (⏻) meaning that the device was only in a low power state, rather than being disconnected from a power supply. Per IEC 60417-5009 this is defined as "stand-by." This allows for ambiguity. For example it could mean that the device is entirely off aside from an illuminated "off" indicator or in a sleep mode.

In April, 1998 the project was submitted to the California Energy Commission with the project starting in June of 2000.

The IEEE New Standards Committee approved working group 1621 to develop a power controls standard in September of 2002. Three months later a draft of IEEE 1621 was published.

The final standard was approved by the American National Standards Institute on 2005-03-24 and the standard was published on 2005-06-08.

== Standards ==
Definitions on power states
Power state	Definition
Disconnected	Off power state with no power supply.
Hard-off	Off power state with no power draw from mains or battery.
Off	A power state with less than or equal power draw and similar functionality compared sleep or on.
On	A power state with greater than or equal power draw and similar functionality compared sleep or off.
Sleep	A power state with less than or equal power draw to on and greater than or equal to off.
Soft-off	Off power state with possibility of power draw from mains or battery or not.
Transition	Limited user-perceptible duration of switching power states.

The basic standard power levels as defined in IEEE 1621. All other power levels are variants based off of these 3.

Power state formulas:

$P_{\text{ON}}\geq P_{\text{SLEEP}}$

$P_{\text{SLEEP}}\geq P_{\text{OFF}}$

$P_{\text{LIGHT SLEEP}}\geq P_{\text{DEEP SLEEP}}$ (Note: This equation is only for guidance for other power states.)

Power state indications
State	Indicators light colors		Symbol
State	Power	Sleep	Symbol
On	Green	Off	
Sleep	Yellow	Yellow	
Off	Off	Off	
Error	Red	Off	
Error	Green (alternating with yellow or with sleep's indicator light) (Note: This scheme shall not be used to indicate a safety hazard.)	Yellow (alternating with power's indicator light) (Note: This scheme shall not be used to indicate a safety hazard.)	

Power symbols
Symbol	Name	Usage
	On	For a switch.
	Off	For a switch.
⏼	On/Off	On a switch that always switches off to a hard-off state.
⏻	Power	On a switch where it either can variability switch to a soft-off or a hard-off state.
	Sleep	For a sleep button or indicator.

== Regulation ==
Energy Star encourages the use of IEEE 1621.

EU Commission Decision 2009/347/EC encourages the use of IEEE 1621.

EU Commission Decision 2016/1756 encourages the use of IEEE P1621.

== See also ==
- Power symbol
- Human interface guidelines
