= Microangelo Toolset =

Collection of software utilities

- Developers: Eclipsit, Inc.
- Stable release: 6.10.0071 / 13 February 2013; 13 years ago
- Operating system: Windows 7 and later
- Platform: IA-32
- Size: 11 MB
- Type: Icon editor
- Website: microangelo.us

Microangelo Toolset is a collection of software utilities (Studio, Explorer, Librarian, Animator, On Display) for editing Microsoft Windows computer icons and pointers.

Microangelo Toolset was previously one of the best known icon editing and creation software tools in the late 90s through early 00s, being notable for winning the Shareware Industry Awards 6 times in 7 years. However, it was later superseded in popularity by tools such as Adobe's line of products and GIMP.

== See also ==
- List of icon software
