= Frenzic =

2007 video game

- Mac OS X icon
- Developers: The Iconfactory; ARTIS Software
- Publisher: Two Tribes B.V. (DSiWare)
- Programmer: Wolfgang Ante
- Platforms: Mac OS X, iOS, DSiWare
- Release: Mac OS X February 20, 2007 iPhone OS; November 19, 2008; DSiWare: PAL: November 26, 2010; NA: November 29, 2010
- Genre: Puzzle
- Mode: Single-player

Frenzic is a puzzle video game released by The Iconfactory and ARTIS Software on February 20, 2007 for Mac OS X, followed by Nintendo DSiWare in November 2010. According to the game credits, the concept of the game was invented by German developer Wolfgang Ante who gave the idea to The Iconfactory, and later did most of the programming for the game. Frenzic's tagline is, "Takes minutes to learn and months to master", which is heavily agreed on by its reviewers.

A sequel, titled Frenzic: Overtime, was released thirteen years later on June 18, 2021, for modern iOS, macOS, and tvOS devices as part of Apple Arcade.

== Gameplay ==
The objective of the game is to fill the six circles around the game board with different colored pie wedges that appear on screen before the timer runs out. When a circle is completed with six pie wedges, the wedges disappear, and points are earned for all wedges cleared from the circle. More points are credited when more wedges of the same color are cleared, and vice versa. However, if a wedge is not placed before the timer runs out, a life is lost, prompting the player to make quick decisions. As the game progresses, the timer runs faster. The game ends when all four lives are used up.
