= Lodsys =

Former US patent monetization company

Lodsys, LLC
- Type: Private
- Industry: Patent monetization
- Defunct: Presumably 2015
- Fate: Presumably shut down
- Headquarters: Marshall, TX, USA
- Key people: Mark Small, CEO
- Website: www.lodsys.com

Lodsys, LLC was an American patent holding company located in Marshall, Texas that brought patent infringement lawsuits against a variety of companies in the US. Numerous app development enterprises have accused them of "patent trolling".

== History ==
In February, 2011, Lodsys sued several companies, including Canon, Hewlett Packard, Lexmark, Novell and Motorola claiming that the companies had violated exclusive rights covered by one or more Lodsys patents. Patents referenced in the suit were the "565" patent, the "078" patent, and the "908" patent.

On May 31, 2011, Lodsys asserted two of its four patents, the "565" patent and the "078" patent against:

- Combay
- The Iconfactory
- Illusion Labs
- Shovelmate
- QuickOffice
- Richard Shinderman of Brooklyn, New York
- Wulven Game Studios of Hanoi, Vietnam

On June 7, 2011 Foresee Results filed for declaratory judgment against Lodsys in northern Illinois, related to Lodsys claims against Adidas, Best Buy and WE Energies. The claim by Foresee alleged that several Lodsys patents are invalid. Foresee Results published a press release on November 23, 2011 stating that they had reached a settlement with Lodsys that resolved all outstanding litigation claims.

On May 13, 2011, it was reported that they had demanded that a number of iOS application developers obtain licenses from them. Apple responded to Lodsys stating that Apple's licenses protect its app developers.

Starting in June 2011, a number of adult businesses received patent infringement notices from Lodsys over the "078" patent, citing the businesses' use of interactive online advertisements, subscription models, and data collection violating Lodsys' patents.

On January 5, 2012 Bold Software, a live support software provider, settled with Lodsys to resolve infringement claims between Lodsys and Bold Software's past, present and future customers for the use of Bold Software products.

On June 4, 2012, Oracle sued Lodsys in an attempt to appease some of its customers that Lodsys had prosecuted.

On January 29, 2013 Lodsys sued General Motors, Oriental Trading Company, Crocs, Somerset Investments and Saks over the "565" and "078" patents.

On February 28, 2013 Lodsys sued Steris, PromoManagers, Loews Hotels, Optics Planet, SuperValu, Volkswagen of America, Retail Concepts, 4imprint, and BullionVault, citing the businesses use of interactive chat software and the "565" and "078" patents.

On September 30, 2013 Lodsys dropped its patent lawsuit against Kaspersky Lab after their refusal to settle. This was the result of Lodsys suing Kaspersky Lab and 54 other companies in May 2012. Out of the 55 companies only Kaspersky Lab managed to have the lawsuit "dismissed with prejudice" while others settled the case with Lodsys to avoid a costly trial.

Sometime between 2014 and 2015, Lodsys' website domain expired and was shut down, it can be assumed that Lodsys, LLC shut down as well.

Lodsys stated that it was not a corporate subsidiary of patent holding company Intellectual Ventures, contrary to speculation from media sources.

== Patents ==
Lodsys owned four patents. None of the patents were developed by Lodsys, but each listed Daniel H. Abelow as the inventor. The patents were related to interacting with customers over the internet in relationship to products and services. Lodsys claimed this included online help, customer support, tutorials, on-line upgrades, surveys, etc. The former patents are:

- U.S. Patent 5,999,908 - (The "908" patent) "Customer-based product design module"
- U.S. Patent 7,133,834 - (The "834" patent) "Product Value Information Interchange Server"
- U.S. Patent 7,222,078 - (The "078" patent) "Methods and Systems for Gathering Information from Units of a Commodity Across a Network"
- U.S. Patent 7,620,565 - (The "565" patent) "Customer-based product design module"

All four patents expired between 2012 and 2013.

== See also ==
- Mobile application development
- PatentFreedom
