= Power symbol =

Symbol showing if electrical power is on

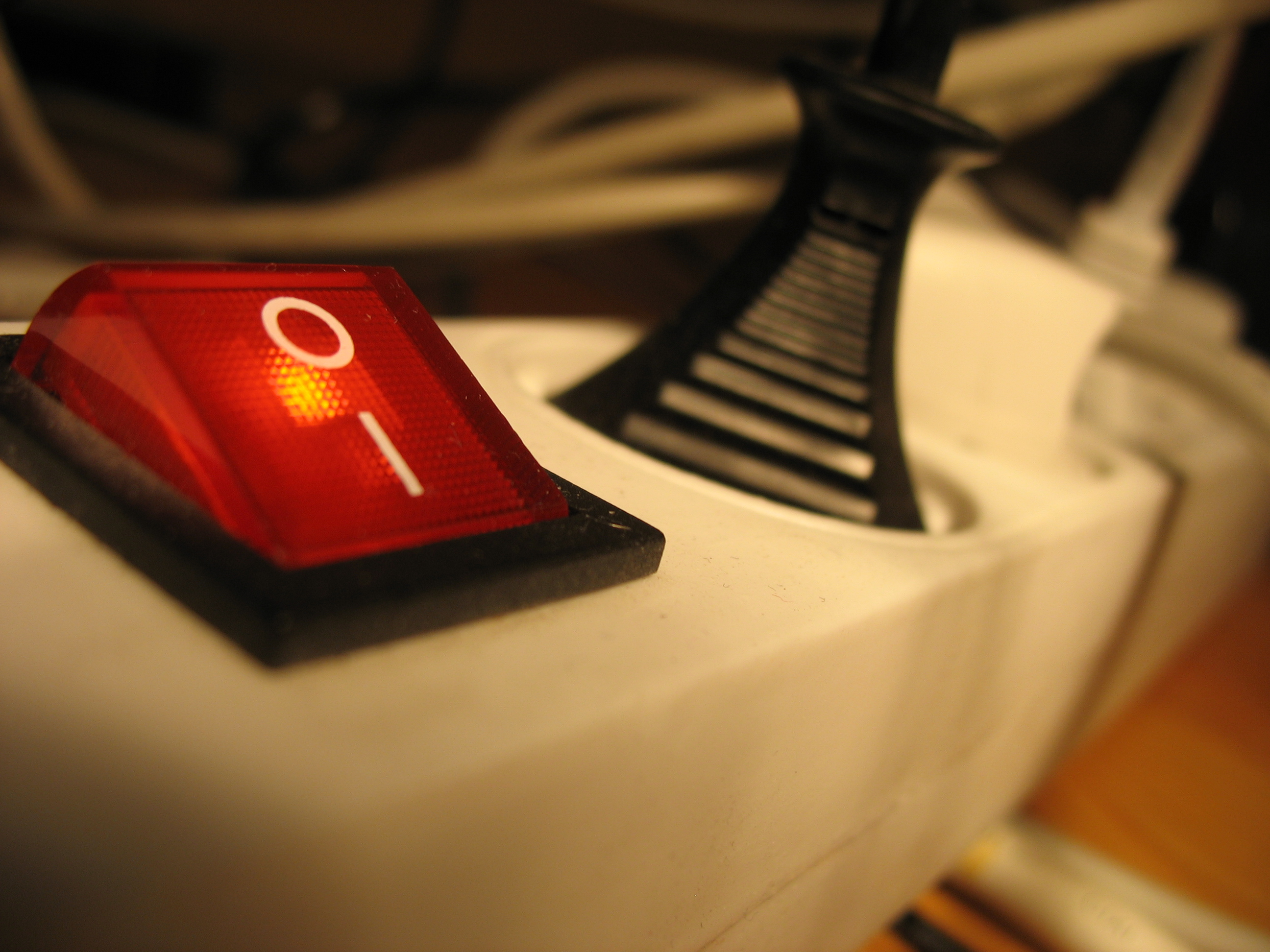
Power On (IEC 60417-5007) and Power Off (IEC 60417-5008) symbols are used to indicate positions of the rocker switch

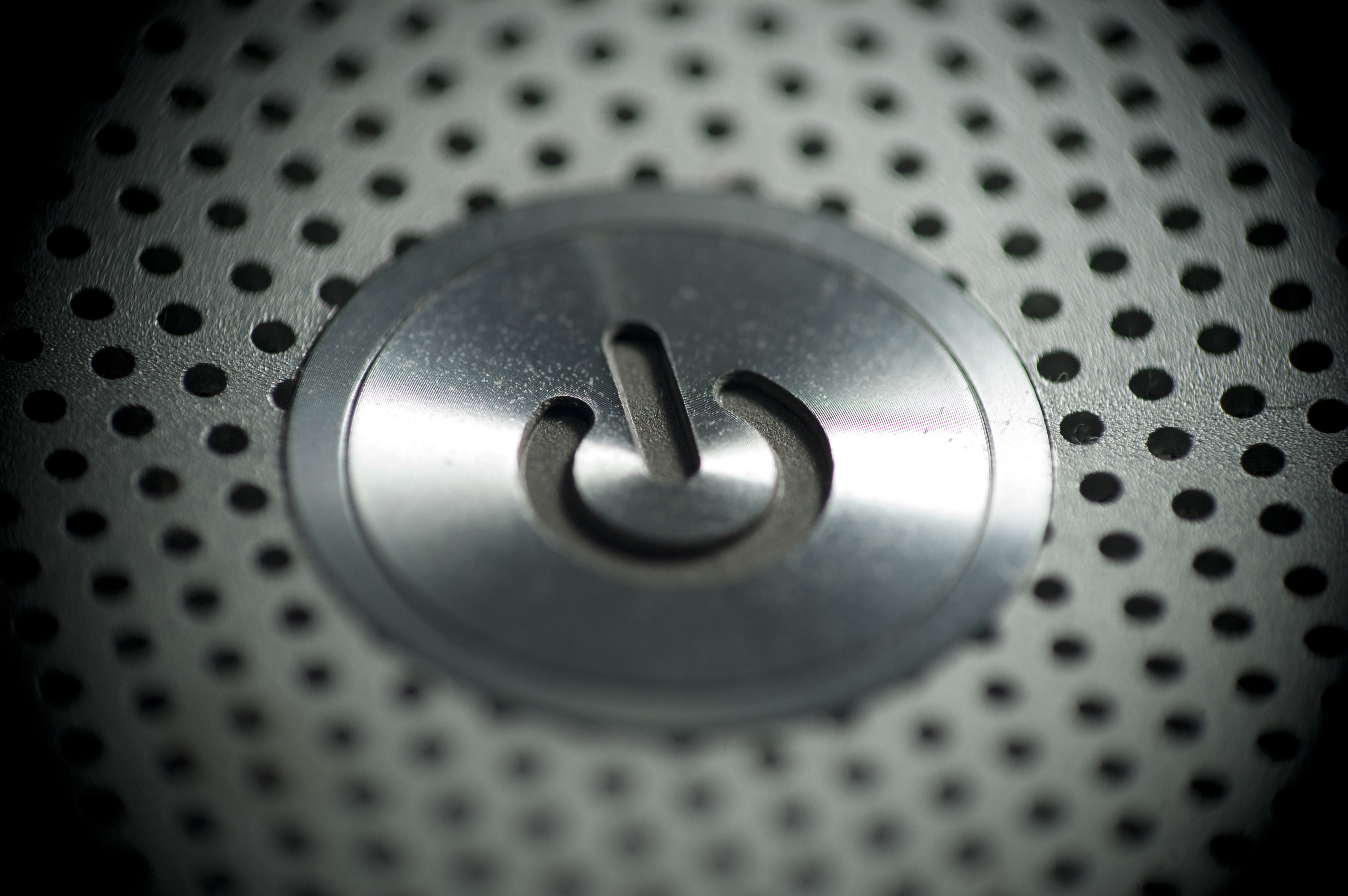
Power button marked with Standby symbol (IEC 60417-5009) turns the device on or off without fully disconnecting power supply

A power symbol is a symbol indicating that a control activates or deactivates a device. Such a control may be a rocker switch, a toggle switch, a push-button, a virtual switch on a display screen, or some other user interface. The internationally standardized symbols are intended to communicate their function in a language-independent manner.

== Standby symbol ambiguity ==
Because the exact meaning of the standby symbol on a given device may be unclear until the control is tried, it has been proposed that a separate sleep symbol, a crescent moon, instead be used to indicate a low power state. Proponents include the California Energy Commission and the Institute of Electrical and Electronics Engineers. Under this proposal, the older standby symbol would be redefined as a generic "power" indication, in cases where the difference between it and the other power symbols would not present a safety concern. This alternative symbolism was published as IEEE standard 1621 on December 8, 2004.

== Standards ==
Universal power symbols are described in the International Electrotechnical Commission (IEC) 60417 standard, Graphical symbols for use on equipment, appearing in the 1973 edition of the document (as IEC 417) and informally used earlier.

Symbol	Description
⏽	IEC 60417-5007, the power-on symbol (line), appearing on a button or one end of a toggle switch indicates that the control places the equipment into a fully powered state. (1 or | means on.)
⭘	IEC 60417-5008, the power-off symbol (circle) on a button or toggle, indicates that using the control will disconnect power to the device. (0 or ◯ means off.)
⏻	IEC 60417-5009, the standby symbol (line partially within a broken circle), indicates a sleep mode or low power state. The switch does not fully disconnect the device from its power supply. This may appear on a toggle switch opposite a power on symbol, alone on a pushbutton that places the device into a standby state, or alone on a button that switches between on and standby. Alternatively, under IEEE 1621, this symbol simply means "power".
⏼	IEC 60417-5010, the power on-off symbol (line within a circle), is used on buttons that switch a device between on and fully off states.
⏾	A crescent moon, indicating sleep mode, is added by IEEE 1621 as a replacement for the standby symbol.

== Unicode ==
Because of widespread use of the power symbol, a campaign was launched by Terence Eden to add the set of characters to Unicode. In February 2015, the proposal was accepted by Unicode and the characters were included in Unicode 9.0. The characters are in the "Miscellaneous Technical" block, with code points 23FB-FE, with the exception of U+2B58 ⭘ HEAVY CIRCLE, which belongs to the "Miscellaneous Symbols and Arrows" block.

- U+23FB ⏻ POWER SYMBOL (IEC 60417-5009 stand-by symbol, IEEE 1621 power symbol)
- U+23FC ⏼ POWER ON-OFF SYMBOL (IEC 60417-5010)
- U+23FD ⏽ POWER ON SYMBOL (IEC 60417-5007)
- U+2B58 ⭘ HEAVY CIRCLE (Used for IEC 60417-5008 power off symbol)
- U+23FE ⏾ POWER SLEEP SYMBOL

== In popular culture ==
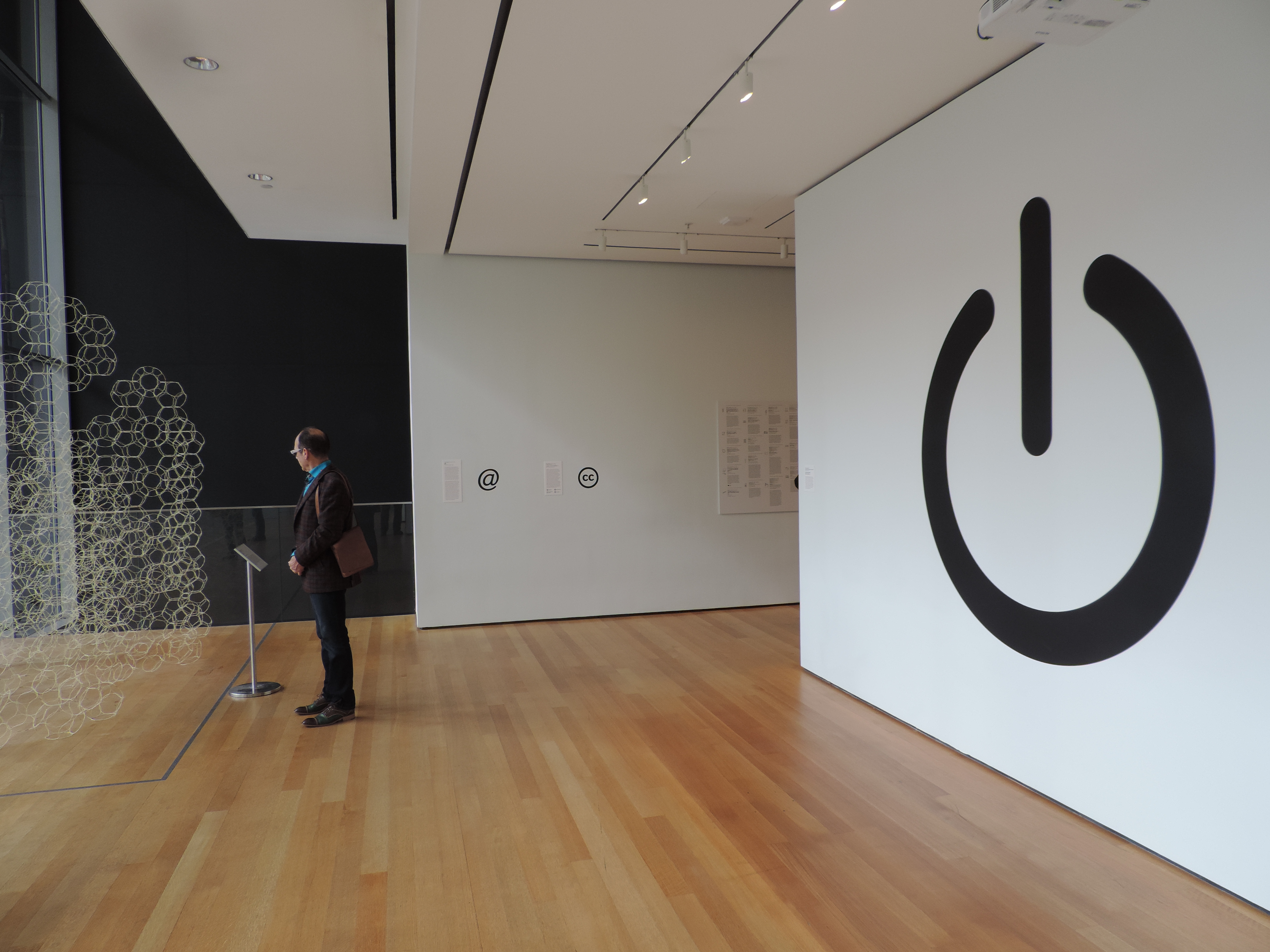
Power symbol as exhibit item at MoMA

The standby symbol, frequently seen on personal computers, is a popular icon among technology enthusiasts. It is often found emblazoned on fashion items including t-shirts and cuff-links. It has also been used in corporate logos, such as for Gateway, Inc. (circa 2002), Staples, Inc. easytech, Exelon, Toggl and others, as record sleeve art (Garbage's "Push It") and even as personal tattoos. In March 2010, the New York City health department announced they would be using it on condom wrappers. The 2012 television series Revolution, set in a dystopian future in which "the power went out", as the opening narration puts it, stylized the second letter 'o' of its title as the standby symbol. The power symbol was a part of exhibition at MoMA.

On 15 October 2019, 786 employees of Volkswagen Group United Kingdom Limited formed the world's largest human power symbol at Millbrook Proving Ground.

== See also ==
- List of international common standards
- Reset button
- IEEE 1621
