= Apple Icon Image format =

Apple Icon Image
- Filename extension: .icns
- Internet media type: image/x-icns
- Type code: icns
- Uniform Type Identifier (UTI): com.apple.icns
- Magic number: 69 63 6e 73
- Developed by: Apple Inc.
- Type of format: Icon file format

The Apple Icon Image format (.icns) is an icon format used in Apple Inc.'s macOS. It supports icons of 16 × 16, 32 × 32, 48 × 48, 128 × 128, 256 × 256, 512 × 512 points at 1x and 2x scale, with both 1- and 8-bit alpha channels and multiple image states (example: open and closed folders). The fixed-size icons can be scaled by the operating system and displayed at any intermediate size.

As of macOS 11, asset catalogs are the preferred file format for macOS custom icons.

== File structure ==
The file format consists of an 8 byte header, followed by any number of icons.

=== Header ===
Offset	Size	Purpose
0	4	Magic literal, must be "icns" (0x69, 0x63, 0x6e, 0x73)
4	4	Length of file, in bytes, msb first

=== Icon data ===
Offset	Size	Purpose
0	4	Icon type, see OSType below.
4	4	Length of data, in bytes (including type and length), msb first
8	Variable	Icon data

=== Icon types ===
OSType	Length (bytes)	Size (pixels)	Supported OS Version	Description
ICON	128	32×32	1.0	1-bit mono icon
ICN#	256	32×32	6.0	1-bit mono icon with 1-bit mask
icm#	48	16×12	6.0	1 bit mono icon with 1-bit mask
icm4	96	16×12	7.0	4 bit icon
icm8	192	16×12	7.0	8 bit icon
ics#	64	16×16	6.0	1-bit mono icon with 1-bit mask
ics4	128	16×16	7.0	4-bit icon
ics8	256	16×16	7.0	8 bit icon
is32	varies^{1} (768)	16×16	8.5	24-bit RGB icon
s8mk	256	16×16	8.5	8-bit mask
icl4	512	32×32	7.0	4-bit icon
icl8	1024	32×32	7.0	8-bit icon
il32	varies^{1} (3072)	32×32	8.5	24-bit RGB icon
l8mk	1024	32×32	8.5	8-bit mask
ich#	576	48×48	8.5	1-bit mono icon with 1-bit mask
ich4	1152	48×48	8.5	4-bit icon
ich8	2304	48×48	8.5	8-bit icon
ih32	varies^{1} (6912)	48×48	8.5	24-bit RGB icon
h8mk	2304	48×48	8.5	8-bit mask
it32	varies^{1} (49152 + 4)^{2}	128×128	10.0	24-bit RGB icon
t8mk	16384	128×128	10.0	8-bit mask
icp4	varies	16x16	10.7	JPEG 2000^{†} or PNG^{†} format or 24-bit RGB icon
icp5	varies	32x32	10.7	JPEG 2000^{†} or PNG^{†} format or 24-bit RGB icon
icp6	varies	48x48	10.7	JPEG 2000^{†} or PNG^{†} format
ic07	varies	128x128	10.7	JPEG 2000 or PNG format
ic08	varies	256x256	10.5	JPEG 2000 or PNG format
ic09	varies	512x512	10.5	JPEG 2000 or PNG format
ic10	varies	1024x1024	10.7	JPEG 2000 or PNG format (512x512@2x "retina" in 10.8)
ic11	varies	32x32	10.8	JPEG 2000 or PNG format (16x16@2x "retina")
ic12	varies	64x64	10.8	JPEG 2000 or PNG format (32x32@2x "retina")
ic13	varies	256x256	10.8	JPEG 2000 or PNG format (128x128@2x "retina")
ic14	varies	512x512	10.8	JPEG 2000 or PNG format (256x256@2x "retina")
ic04	varies^{1} (1024)	16x16		ARGB or JPEG 2000^{†} or PNG^{†} format
ic05	varies^{1} (4096)	32x32		ARGB or JPEG 2000^{†} or PNG^{†} format (16x16@2x "retina")
icsb	varies^{1} (1296)	18x18		ARGB or JPEG 2000^{†} or PNG^{†} format
icsB	varies	36x36		JPEG 2000 or PNG format (18x18@2x "retina")
sb24	varies	24x24		JPEG 2000 or PNG format
SB24	varies	48x48		JPEG 2000 or PNG format (24x24@2x "retina")

- ^{1.} The value inside the parenthesis is the uncompressed length for ARGB and 24-bit RGB icons.
- ^{2.} it32 data always starts with a header of four zero-bytes (tested all icns files in macOS 10.15.7 and macOS 11). Usage unknown, the four zero-bytes can be any value and are quietly ignored.
- ^{†.} These formats are supported in standalone icns files but do not display properly if used as application icon inside a .app package.

==== Image data format ====
- Mono icons with alpha mask can display three colors: white, black, and transparent.
- The 4-bit an 8-bit icons use a fixed color palette with 16 colors and 256 colors, respectively.
- The 24-bit RGB format consists of the three compressed channels tightly packed (see Compression). The it32 icon must start with a four-byte header, see footnote above.
- The ARGB format consists of the ascii values for 'ARGB' and the four compressed channels tightly packed (see Compression).

==== Compatibility ====
- the ARGB fields also accept files in PNG format – but not vice versa, you can not put ARGB images in any of the PNG-only fields (tested on macOS 11).
- ARGB images are only supported in macOS 11 and newer – macOS 10.15.7 does not display ARGB images. Yet, even the ARGB keys can be displayed on macOS 10.15 if you set a JPEG 2000 or PNG image (see footnote on usage in app packages above).
- The 24-bit RGB icons (is32, il32, ih32, it32) also allow images in JPEG 2000 and PNG format (tested on macOS 10.15.7 and macOS 11).
- The support for newer image types seems to be introduced later than the key field (see previous two points). Therefore, the supported OS version may not be accurate or adjusted based on file format.

=== Other types ===
OSType	Description
'TOC '	"Table of Contents" a list of all image types in the file, and their sizes (added in Mac OS X 10.7). A TOC is written out as an identifier (4 bytes) and size (4 bytes). Each subsequent record (8 bytes each) maps to the icon formats found in the file. The data isn't included in this phase.
'icnV'	4-byte big endian float - equal to the bundle version number of Icon Composer.app that created the icon
'name'	Usage unknown (all tested files use either "icon" or "template").
'info'	Info binary plist. Usage unknown (only name field seems to be used).
'sbtp'	Nested "template" icns file. Usage unknown.
'slct'	Nested "selected" icns file. Usage unknown.
FD D9 2F A8	Nested "dark" icns file. Allows automatic icon switching in Dark mode. (added in macOS 10.14). Note: The contents of this record is a full .icns file with multiple formats. If the record bytes are written out to disk, the icns file header and file size are still required to see the full dark mode icon.

- The table of contents is a list of all contained types (4 byte type-name + 4 byte length).
- The data for all nested icns files does not contain the icns file-header. So, if you want to save the data to a file you have to prepend the icns header.

== Non-PNG / JPEG2000 element types ==
Element types that deal with ARGB (32-bit) or RGB (24-bit) image formats require different types of headers before the binary data. This header is part of the image data and is not the 4-byte big endian icon element type value (e.g. ic04 or ic05).

=== ARGB elements ===
ARGB images must have their binary portion of the image data preceded by the four byte 'ARGB' header. After that, instead of each pixel with each of its four channels stored together (e.g. ARGBARGBARGB), an image with three pixels would be stored in individual channels of pixel data (e.g. AAARRRGGGBBB). In addition, each channel of pixel data needs to be encoded as mentioned below.

=== RGB elements ===
RGB images have their binary portion of the image data preceded by four zero byte characters only when the element type is 'it32'. In all other cases, no header is needed. Channel data is separated as with the ARGB binary data (e.g. RRRGGGBBB instead of RGBRGBRGB). Each channel must also be encoded as mentioned below.

=== Mask elements ===
Mask elements are not encoded like ARGB and RGB image color channel data. The data is the same as that of an ARGB image except only the alpha channel data is provided. So for an image that has two pixels, ARGBARGB, the mask data is AA.

== Compression ==
lead value	tail bytes	result uncompressed
0...127	1...128	1...128 bytes
128...255	1 byte	3...130 copies

Over time the format has been improved and there is support for compression of some parts of the pixel data. The 24-bit RGB (is32, il32, ih32, it32, icp4, icp5) and ARGB (ic04, ic05, icsb) pixel data are compressed (per channel) with a format similar to PackBits. Some sources mention that the OS supports both compressed or uncompressed data chunks. However, manually crafting icns files with uncompressed 24-bit RGB or ARGB images will not display properly – at least on newer macOS releases (tested on macOS 11).

Here is a GitHub repo with some swift code that appears to pass the test for both encoding and decoding as described here: ByteRunLengthCoder

The following pseudocode decompresses the data:

'''While''' there '''is''' compressed data:
    Read one byte '''as''' an '''unsigned number''' N
    '''If''' N < 0x80:
        Output the next (N + 1) bytes
    '''Else''':
        Output the next byte (N - 0x80 + 3) times

Example: 02 01 02 02 80 03 81 04 82 05 should decompress to 01 02 02 03 03 03 04 04 04 04 05 05 05 05 05

The following pseudocode compresses the data:

'''function''' Encode(input data)
  '''Initialize''' output '''as''' an '''empty array'''
  '''Set''' index '''to''' 0

  '''While''' index <dfn   class="explain " ><span title="is less than"><</span></dfn> the count of data
    '''Initialize''' sequence '''as''' an '''empty array'''
    '''Set''' count '''to''' 0

    ''// Unique sequence''
    '''While''' count <dfn   class="explain " ><span title="is less than or equal to">≤</span></dfn> 0x7F '''and''' index <dfn   class="explain " ><span title="is less than"><</span></dfn> count of data
      '''If''' index + 2 <dfn   class="explain " ><span title="is less than"><</span></dfn> count of data '''and''' data<templatestyles src="Template:Tooltip/styles.css" /><span class="rt-commentedText tooltip tooltip-dotted "   title="{{#parsoid

Example: 01 02 02 03 03 03 04 04 04 04 05 05 05 05 05 should compress to 02 01 02 02 80 03 81 04 82 05

== Known issues ==
As of macOS 11, there are certain issues / bugs with the file format:

1. Setting is32+ics8 or ih32+ich8 will display a proper icon. But setting il32+icl8 ignores the transparency mask and displays an icon without transparency.
2. Compressed ARGB data is not interpreted correctly. The last value of the blue channel (aka. the very last value) is ignored and treated as if it were all zero-bytes. Usually this is no issue since most icons will have transparency at the bottom right corner anyway. However, it can become an issue if the last value is a repeating byte (see Compression). Potentially, up to 130 pixels can lack the blue channel value.
  A workaround is to append an additional byte at the end which is interpreted as a control character without following data. You can compare the difference with these two examples:
  - 69636E73 00000024 69633034 0000001C 41524742 FFFFFBFF FF00FB00 FF00FB00 FFFFFBFF
  - 69636E73 00000025 69633034 0000001D 41524742 FFFFFBFF FF00FB00 FF00FB00 FFFFFBFF 00
3. macOS 10.15.7 (likely earlier) and later versions have an issue displaying PNG and JPEG 2000 icons for the keys icp4 (16x16), icp5 (32x32), and icp6 (64x64). The keys work fine in a standalone icns file but if used in an application, the icons are displayed completely scrambled. Either use the new ARGB format ic04 and ic05 (macOS 11+) or the old 24-bit RGB + alpha mask format. Use the latter with the old keys is32+s8mk and il32+l8mk, or with the newer keys icp4+s8mk and icp5+l8mk (writing RGB data into PNG fields). If using ARGB image data, make sure to provide alternative formats for macOS 10.15 and earlier. This issue is especially tricky to detect if you provide both, 16x16 and 16x16@2x icons, because if you connect your Mac to a non-retina monitor, the non-retina 16x16 icon will be used and thus the icon will be displayed scrambled. The icp6 field does not seem to be used in application icons and can safely be ignored. Additionally, if you don't provide the smaller icon sizes at all the bug will also manifest when the OS scales down your larger PNG/JPEG 2000 icons, so make sure to render smaller sizes and include them.

== Support ==
Various apps can open *.icns files including Preview and GTK+, with some offering the ability to convert *.icns to and from PNG as well. Former tools specializing in icon file support include Icon Composer and icns Browser from Apple, IconBuilder from The Iconfactory, and CandyBar from Panic.

MacOS offers the built-in iconutil command line tool to pack and unpack *.icns files.

== See also ==
- ICO format on Windows
- X PixMap format for X11
