= The Iconfactory =

Software and graphic design company

- Industry: Graphic design, software
- Founded: April 1996
- Headquarters: United States
- Owner: Corey Marion, Talos Tsui, and Gedeon Maheux
- Website: www.iconfactory.com

The Iconfactory is a software and graphic design company that designs commercial icons and user interfaces and publishes desktop applications and mobile apps for macOS and iOS.

== History ==
The Iconfactory was founded in April 1996 by three artists: Corey Marion, Talos Tsui, and Gedeon Maheux. Craig Hockenberry joined the company in 1997 as the lead engineer and Dave Brasgalla joined in January 1999. The company incorporated in January 2000. The Iconfactory gained popularity through the creation of packages of free icons for download.

From 1997 until 2004, the Iconfactory held an annual icon design contest for the Macintosh icon community called Pixelpalooza. The competition was a chance for artists to design and produce original icon creations for the chance of winning software and hardware prizes. Pixelpalooza was discontinued in 2005 and is now "on hiatus for an indefinite time."

The Iconfactory created over 100 icons for Microsoft to be included in the Windows XP operating system. They also created the base icons in Windows Vista's Aero interface. In 2004, they created over 100 icons for the Xbox 360 user interface and website.

In 2007, the Iconfactory developed Twitterrific for macOS and iOS. The company also created the video game Frenzic for macOS, which they also released for iOS and DSiWare; a sequel titled Frenzic: Overtime was released for Apple Arcade.

In 2025, the Iconfactory launched Tapestry for iOS and iPadOS, an app that integrates feeds from Bluesky, Mastodon, RSS, YouTube, and more into a unified timeline.

== Alleged patent infringement ==
On May 31, 2011, Lodsys asserted two of its four patents: U.S. Patent No. 7,620,565 ("the '565 patent") on a "customer-based design module" and U.S. Patent No. 7,222,078 ("the '078 patent") on "Methods and Systems for Gathering Information from Units of a Commodity Across a Network." against Iconfactory and 6 other developers for using Apple's API for in-app purchases. Apple responded by stating Apple's licenses protect its app developers.

== See also ==
- Computer Icons
- Icon design
- IconBuilder
- Icon Composer
