= Font Awesome =

Font and icon toolkit based on CSS and Less

- Developer: Font Awesome Team
- Release: 3 March 2012; 14 years ago
- Stable release: 7.3.1 / 15 July 2026
- Operating system: Cross-platform (web-based application)
- License: Freemium
- Website: fontawesome.com
- Repository: github.com/FortAwesome/Font-Awesome

Font Awesome is a font and icon toolkit based on CSS and JavaScript. As of 2024, Font Awesome was used by 25.4% of sites that use third-party font scripts, placing Font Awesome in second place after Google Fonts.

== History ==
It was made by Dave Gandy originally for use with Bootstrap. Font Awesome can be downloaded from BootstrapCDN.

Font Awesome 5 was released on 7 December 2017, with 1,278 icons. Version 5 comes in two packages: Font Awesome Free and the proprietary Font Awesome Pro (available for $120 a year). The free versions (all releases up to 4 and the Free version for 5, 6, and 7) are available under the SIL Open Font License 1.1, Creative Commons Attribution 4.0, and the MIT License.

Font Awesome 7 is the latest version which was released in July 2025. Users will be able to upload their own icons and receive more icons on top of the existing ones from Font Awesome 6.

On 16 March 2022, Font Awesome announced a collaboration with United Nations Office for the Coordination of Humanitarian Affairs (OCHA) for humanitarian icons in Font Awesome 6.1.0.

Font Awesome released the rest of the Duotone styles for both the Duotone and Sharp Duotone families. The price for Font Awesome Pro Lite, Pro, and Pro Max will increase from $49, $99 and $499 a year to $60, $120 and $600 a year starting in 2025.

In Font Awesome 7, the Pro+ tiers of plans were introduced, Pro Lite+, Pro+ and Pro Max+ at $75, $150 and $750 a year. It gives you access to new icon packs, which contains a curated collection of 200 of the most common icons needed for app and web design. There currently are 7 icon packs: Chisel, Etch, Jelly, Notdog, Slab, Thumbprint, and Whiteboard.
