= Rajie Cook =

Palestinian-American graphic designer (1930–2021)

- Cook in a portrait by Thomas Francisco
- Born: July 6, 1930; Newark, New Jersey, US
- Died: February 6, 2021 (aged 90); Newtown, Pennsylvania, US
- Education: Pratt Institute
- Occupations: Graphic designer, artist
- Years active: 1953–2021
- Spouse: Margit Schneider (m. 1955)
- Children: 2
- Awards: Presidential Award for Design Excellence (1985)

Rajie Cook (July 6, 1930 – February 6, 2021), also known as Roger Cook, was a Palestinian-American graphic designer, artist, peace activist, humanitarian and photographer.

Cook was born in Newark, New Jersey, in 1930, into a Palestinian Christian family. He was president of Cook and Shanosky Associates, a graphic design firm he founded in 1967. The firm produced all forms of corporate communications including: Corporate Identity, Advertising, Signage, Annual Reports and Brochures.

His graphic design and photography have been used by IBM, Container Corporation of America, Montgomery Ward, Bristol Myers Squibb, Black & Decker, Volvo, Subaru, AT&T, New York Times, Bell Atlantic, BASF, Lenox, and a number of other major international corporations.

He received the Presidential Award for Design Excellence from president Ronald Reagan and Elizabeth Dole on January 30, 1984 in the Indian Treaty Room of the Old Executive Office Building in Washington, DC. Juries under the auspices of the National Endowments chose the thirteen winners of the Federal Design Achievement Awards for the Arts.

Symbols Signs representing, from left, "Escalator (up)," "Nursery" and "Ground transportation" designed by Cook and Shanosky for the US Department of Transportation.

In 2003, Symbols Signs, a project designed by his firm for the US Department of Transportation, was accepted by the Acquisitions Committee to the collections of Cooper-Hewitt, National Design Museum, and The Smithsonian Institution.

Cook was a graduate of the Pratt Institute and in 1997 was selected as Alumni of the year, and has also served on the Pratt Advisory Board. He has been a member of the American Institute of Graphic Arts. He died in Newtown, Pennsylvania, on February 6, 2021.

== Sculptural assemblages ==
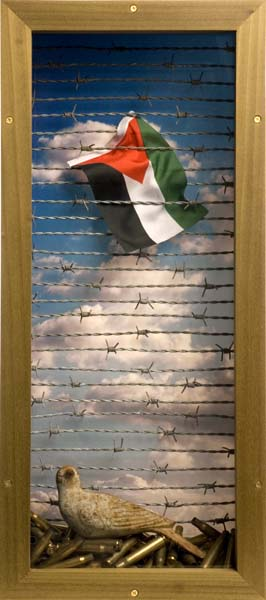
All Flights Cancelled, sculptural assemblage, 2006

Inspired in part by the work of Joseph Cornell, Cook has turned to sculptural assemblage.

In 1999, after 46 years as a graphic designer, I found time to explore this new medium, sculptural "assemblage". The inspiration and opportunity to explore this mode of artistic expression comes at a time when my commercial career has sufficiently matured so that I can apply my skills, experiences, and a lifetime of artistic perspective to create "statements" with these assemblages. Most of my "raw" materials come from private collections, my own photography, flea markets, and antique shops, where I spend hours searching for items that inspire use in my boxes. My process, using these "found" materials, feels to me much like theater. As in the legitimate stage, I work within a three-dimensional form to portray the comedy or tragedy of life. I create these miniature, silent, "theaters" to express my feelings about a range of subjects. The three-dimensional objects I construct, using the found and fabricated objects (my "Thespians"), are a series of "performances" that share my deepest feelings with my audience.

Many of the “Boxes” that he has created are an expression of the artist’s deeply felt concern for human rights and for the tragic conditions in the Middle East. They were created to articulate the circumstances and experiences he encountered during the ten years he has served on the Task Force for the Middle East, a group sponsored by the Presbyterian Church (USA). With this group he has traveled on fact-finding trips to Jordan and Palestine (West Bank and Gaza). One such sculpture was exhibited as part of the exhibition Made in Palestine at the Station Museum of Contemporary Art in 2003.

== Early and personal life ==
Rajie Sulaiman Cook (Arabic: راجي سليمان كوك) was born in 1930 to Palestinian Christian parents Jalila Totah (Arabic: جليلة طوطح) and Najeeb Esa Cook (Arabic: نجيب عيسى كوك), who came from Ramallah. His parents immigrated from the Mandate of Palestine to the United States in 1927. The family’s original surname was Sulaiman, however his grandfather was nicknamed Küçük (small) by Ottoman Turkish personnel, which was Anglicized to Cook under the British Mandate for Palestine. After an elementary school teacher told Rajie that his name was too difficult to pronounce, Rajie became known as Roger, a name he was referred to until he re-embraced Rajie in his older years.

Rajie met his wife of 65 years, Margit "Peggy" Schneider, in 1944. She was, as he wrote, "a woman of intelligence and integrity, the kind of life companion who would explore this path I wanted to follow with me." Rajie and Peggy devoted their lives to their love of modern design; in 1969 they moved with their daughters Cyndi and Cathie to a Bauhaus-inspired glass and stone home they built in the woods of Washington Crossing, Pennsylvania. Rajie was an avid tennis player, a brave bee keeper, and accomplished bluegrass musician.

Cook died in 2021 of myelodysplastic syndrome in hospice at Chandler Hall in Newtown, Pennsylvania.
