= Iconfinder =

Web search engine

- Website type: Search engine
- Available in: English
- Headquarters: Copenhagen, Denmark
- Area served: Worldwide
- Owner: Magnific
- Founder: Martin LeBlanc Eigtved
- Key people: Martin LeBlanc Eigtved (CEO)
- Employees: 7 (2017)
- Website: www.iconfinder.com
- Advertising: BuySellAds
- Launched: 5 May 2007

Iconfinder was a web company whose main product is a search engine for icons. The company was founded in 2007 by Martin LeBlanc Eigtved. Iconfinder gained popularity after a relaunch in 2009.

As of 2012, Iconfinder had 1.1 million registered accounts.

Iconfinder received $1.5 M in funding from the Danish venture capital fund, VF Venture.

In 2022 it was acquired by Magnific.

In October 2025, the company announced via e-mail that they would discontinue the service effective November 15, 2025. Since then, the website has redirected to Freepik's official site.
