= Resource Hacker =

Programming tool for Windows

- Resource Hacker in Windows 11
- Developer: Angus Johnson
- Release: December 3, 1999
- Stable release: 5.2.8 / March 6, 2025; 17 months ago
- Written in: Delphi
- Operating system: Microsoft Windows
- Size: 6.13 MB (after installation)
- Available in: English, Chinese, Japanese
- Type: Resource extractor & compiler
- License: Proprietary, freeware
- Website: www.angusj.com/resourcehacker/

Resource Hacker (also known as ResHacker or ResHack) is a free resource extraction utility and resource compiler for Windows developed by Angus Johnson. It can be used to add, modify or replace most resources within Windows binaries including strings, images, dialogs, menus, VersionInfo and Manifest resources. Security researchers use it to analyze malware. ResHack can also create resource files (*.res) from scratch, and it provides a number of text templates to facilitate this.

In 2002 the author stated that he had "no plans to continue development". However, since then he has released more updates.

The author also stated that he would neither release nor sell the source code.

- On November 19, 2009, version 3.5.2 was released as a beta. This build added support for 64-bit executables and for displaying PNG images.
- On September 16, 2011, version 3.6 was released with support for PNG icons.
- On May 2, 2015, version 4.0 was released with improved support for 32-bit image files, resources can be started from scratch (with a number of resource templates), and numerous cosmetic improvements.
- On August 17, 2015, version 4.2.5 was released. This build added support for changing a text resource format: Unicode, UTF-8, ANSI.
- On November 20, 2020, version 5.1.8 was published, fixing an issues with PNG images not displaying, adding scrolling and zooming of image resources, and fixing a bug with 100 MB+ binary resources crashing the hex editor.
- On October 31, 2023, version 5.2.4 was released, fixing overflow errors.
- On March 6, 2025, version 5.2.8 was released, fixed bug compiling controls with -1 id in DialogEx.

== See also ==
- Portable Executable
