= Comparison of vector graphics editors =

A number of vector graphics editors exist for various platforms. Potential users of these editors will make comparisons based on factors such as the availability for the user's platform, the software license, the feature set, the merits of the user interface (UI) and the focus of the program. Some programs are more suitable for artistic work while others are better for technical drawings. Another important factor is the application's support of various vector and bitmap image formats for import and export.

The tables in this article compare general and technical information for a number of vector graphics editors. See the article on each editor for further information. This article is neither all-inclusive nor necessarily up-to-date.

== Some editors in detail ==
- Adobe Fireworks (formerly Macromedia Fireworks) is a vector editor with bitmap editing capabilities with its main purpose being the creation of graphics for Web and screen. Fireworks supports RGB color scheme and has no CMYK support. This means it is mostly used for screen design. The native Fireworks file format is editable PNG (FWPNG or PNG). Adobe Fireworks has a competitive price, but its features can seem limited in comparison with other products. It is easier to learn than other products and can produce complex vector artwork. The Fireworks editable PNG file format is not supported by other Adobe products. Fireworks can manage the PSD and AI file formats which enables it to be integrated with other Adobe apps. Fireworks can also open FWPNG/PNG, PSD, AI, EPS, JPG, GIF, BMP, TIFF file formats, and save/export to FWPNG/PNG, PSD, AI (v.8), FXG (v.2.0), JPG, GIF, PDF, SWF and some others. Some support for exporting to SVG is available via a free Export extension. On May 6, 2013, Adobe announced that Fireworks would be phased out.
- Adobe Flash (formerly a Macromedia product) has straightforward vector editing tools that make it easier for designers and illustrators to use. The most important of these tools are vector lines and fills with bitmap-like selectable areas, simple modification of curves via the "selection" or the control points/handles through "direct selection" tools. Flash uses Actionscript for OOP, and has full XML functionality through E4X support.
- Adobe FreeHand (formerly Macromedia Freehand and Aldus Freehand) is mainly used by professional graphic designers. The functionality of FreeHand includes the flexibility of the application in the wide design environment, catering to the output needs of both traditional image reproduction methods and to contemporary print and digital media with its page-layout capabilities and text attribute controls. Specific functions of FreeHand include a superior image-tracing operation for vector editing, page layout features within multiple-page documents, and embedding custom print-settings (such as variable halftone-screen specifications within a single graphic, etc.) to each document independent of auxiliary printer-drivers. User-operation is considered to be more suited for designers with an artistic background compared to designers with a technical background. When being marketed, FreeHand lacked the promotional backing, development and PR support in comparison to other similar products. FreeHand was transferred to the classic print group after Macromedia was purchased by Adobe in 2005. On May 16, 2007, Adobe announced that no further updates to Freehand would be developed but continues to sell FreeHand MX as a Macromedia product. FreeHand continues to run on Mac OS X Snow Leopard (using an Adobe fix) and on Windows 7. For macOS, Affinity Designer is able to open version 10 & MX Freehand files.
- Adobe Illustrator is a commonly used editor because of Adobe's market dominance, but is more expensive than other similar products. It is primarily developed consistently in line with other Adobe products and is best integrated with Adobe's Creative Suite packages. The ai file format is proprietary, but some vector editors can open and save in that format. Illustrator imports over two dozen formats, including PSD, PDF and SVG, and exports AI, PDF, SVG, SVGZ, GIF, JPG, PNG, WBMP, and SWF. However, the user must be aware of unchecking the "Preserve Illustrator Editing Capabilities" option if generating interoperable SVG files is desired.
- Affinity Designer by Serif Europe (the successor to their previous product, DrawPlus) is non-subscription-based software that is often described as an alternative to Adobe Illustrator. The application can open Portable Document Format (PDF), Adobe Photoshop, and Adobe Illustrator files, as well as export to those formats and to the Scalable Vector Graphics (SVG) and Encapsulated PostScript (EPS) formats. It also supports import from some Adobe Freehand files (specifically versions 10 & MX).
- Apache OpenOffice Draw is the vector graphics editor of the Apache OpenOffice open source office suite. It supports many import and export file formats and is available for multiple desktop operating systems.
- Boxy SVG is a chromium-based vector graphics editor for creating illustrations, as well as logos, icons, and other elements of graphic design. It is primarily focused on editing drawings in the SVG file format. The program is available as both a web app and a desktop application for Windows, macOS, ChromeOS, and Linux-based operating systems.
- Collabora Online Draw is the vector graphics editor of the Collabora Online open source office suite. It supports many import and export file formats and is accessible via any modern web browser, it also supports desktop editing features, Collabora Office is available for desktop and mobile operating systems, it is the enterprise ready version of LibreOffice.
- ConceptDraw PRO is a business diagramming tool and vector graphics editor available for both Windows and macOS. It supports multi-page documents, and includes an integrated presentation mode. ConceptDraw PRO supports imports and exports several formats, including Microsoft Visio and Microsoft PowerPoint.
- Corel Designer (originally Micrografx Designer) is one of the earliest vector-based graphics editors for the Microsoft Windows platform. The product is mainly used for the creation of engineering drawings and is shipped with extensive libraries for the needs of engineers. It is also flexible enough for most vector graphics design applications.
- CorelDRAW is an editor used in the graphic design, sign making and fashion design industries. CorelDRAW is capable of limited interoperation by reading file formats from Adobe Illustrator. CorelDRAW has over 50 import and export filters, on-screen and dialog box editing and the ability to create multi-page documents. It can also generate TrueType and Type 1 fonts, although refined typographic control is better suited to a more specific application. Some other features of CorelDRAW include the creation and execution of VBA macros, viewing of colour separations in print preview mode and integrated professional imposing options.
- Dia is a free and open-source diagramming and vector graphics editor available for Windows, Linux and other Unix-based computer operating systems. Dia has a modular design and several shape packages for flowcharting, network diagrams and circuit diagrams. Its design was inspired by Microsoft Visio, although it uses a Single Document Interface similar to other GNOME software (such as GIMP).
- DrawPlus, first built for the Windows platform in 1993, has matured into a full featured vector graphics editor for home and professional users. Also available as a feature-limited free 'starter edition': DrawPlus SE. DrawPlus developers, Serif Europe, have now ceased its development in order to focus on its successor, Affinity Designer.
- Edraw Max is a cross-platform diagram software and vector graphics editor available for Windows, Mac and Linux. It supports kinds of diagram types. It supports imports and exports SVG, PDF, HTML, Multiple page TIFF, Microsoft Visio and Microsoft PowerPoint.
- Embroidermodder is a free machine embroidery software tool that supports a variety of formats and allows the user to add custom modifications to their embroidery designs.
- Fatpaint is a free, light-weight, browser-based graphic design application with built-in vector drawing tools. It can be accessed through any browser with Flash 9 installed. Its integration with Zazzle makes it particularly suitable for people who want to create graphics for custom printed products such as T-shirts, mugs, iPhone cases, flyers and other promotional products.
- Figma is a collaborative web-based online vector graphics editor, used primarily for UX design and prototyping.
- GIMP, which works mainly with raster images, offers a limited set of features to create and record SVG files. It can also load and handle SVG files created with other software like Inkscape.
- Inkscape is a free and open-source vector editor with the primary native format being SVG. Inkscape is available for Linux, Windows, Mac OS X, and other Unix-based systems. Inkscape can import SVG, SVGZ, AI, PDF, JPEG, PNG, GIF (and other raster graphics formats), WMF, CDR (CorelDRAW), VSD (Visio) file formats and export SVG, SVGZ, PNG, PDF, PostScript, EPS, EPSi, LaTeX, HPGL, SIF (Synfig Animation Studio), HTML5 Canvas, FXG (Flash XML Graphics) and POVRay file formats. Some formats have additional support through Inkscape extensions, including PDF, EPS, Adobe Illustrator, Dia, Xfig, CGM, sK1 and Sketch. The predecessor of Inkscape was Sodipodi.
- Ipe lets users draw geometric objects such as polylines, arcs and spline curves and text. Ipe supports use of layers and multiple pages. It can paste bitmap images from clipboard or import from JPEG or BMP, and also through a conversion software it can import PDF figures generated by other software. It differentiates itself from similar programs by including advanced snapping tools and the ability to directly include LaTeX text and equations. Ipe is extensible by use of ipelets, which are plugins written in C++ or Lua.
- LibreOffice Draw is the vector graphics editor of the LibreOffice open source office suite. It supports many import and export file formats and is available for multiple desktop operating systems. The Document Foundation with the help of others is currently developing Android and online versions of the LibreOffice office suite, including Draw.
- Microsoft Expression Design is a commercial vector and bitmap graphics editor based on Creature House Expression, which was acquired by Microsoft in 2003. It was part of the Microsoft Expression Studio suite. Expression Design is discontinued, and is no longer available for download from Microsoft. It runs on Windows XP, Vista, Windows 7 and 8, and on Windows 8.1 and 10 released after it was discontinued.
- Microsoft Visio is a diagramming, flow chart, floor plan and vector graphics editor available for Windows. It is commonly used by small and medium-sized businesses, and by Microsoft in their corporate documentation.
- OmniGraffle, by The Omni Group, is a vector graphics editor available for Macintosh. It is principally used for creating flow charts and other diagrams. OmniGraffle imports and exports several formats, including Microsoft Visio, SVG, and PDF.
- PhotoLine is mainly a raster graphics editor but also offers a comprehensive set of vector drawing tools including multiple paths per layer, layer groups, color management and full color space support including CMYK and Lab color spaces, and multipage documents. PhotoLine can import and export PDF and SVG files as well as all major bitmap formats.
- sK1 is a free and open-source cross-platform vector editor for Linux and Windows which is oriented for "prepress ready" PostScript & PDF output. The major sK1 features are CMYK colorspace support; CMYK support in Postscript; Cairo-based engine; color management; multiple document interface; Pango-based text engine; Universal CDR importer (7-X4 versions); native wxWidgets based user interface. sK1 can import postscript-based AI files, CDR, CDT, CCX, CDRX, CMX, XAR, PS, EPS, CGM, WMF, XFIG, SVG, SK, SK1, AFF, PLT, CPL, ASE, ACO, JCW, GPL, SOC, SKP file formats. It can export AI, SVG, SK, SK1, CGM, WMF, PDF, PS, PLT, CPL, ASE, ACO, JCW, GPL, SOC, SKP file formats.
- SaviDraw, by Silicon Beach Software, is a modern vector drawing program for Windows 10. It is available only from the Microsoft app store. It is designed to work well with touch screens - no functions require keyboard modifiers. It features a new way to draw vector curves (very different from the traditional Pen tool) and has voice-command shortcuts.
- Sketch is a commercial vector graphics application for macOS used primarily for user interface and web design. It offers features such as vector editing, prototyping, and collaboration tools.
- SVG-edit is a FOSS web-based, JavaScript-driven SVG editor that works in any modern browser.
- Synfig Studio (also known as Synfig) is a free and open-source 2D vector graphics and timeline-based computer animation program created by Robert Quattlebaum. Synfig is available for Linux, Windows, macOS. Synfig stores its animations in its own XML file format, SIF (uncompressed) or SIFZ (compressed) and can import SVG.
- VectorStyler by Numeric Path is a professional vector graphics app, currently in advanced beta, available for both macOS and Windows 10 systems. It offers a comprehensive set of vector drawing tools, vector-based brushes, shape and image effects, corner shapes, mesh and shape-based gradients, collision snapping, multi-page documents, and full color space support including CMYK. The application can open Portable Document Format (PDF), Scalable Vector Graphics (SVG), Adobe Illustrator, EPS and also Adobe Photoshop files, as well as export to those formats.
- WinFIG is a shareware Editor with crossplattform. It use the Format of Xfig.
- Xara Photo & Graphic Designer and Designer Pro (formerly Xara Xtreme and Xtreme Pro) are vector graphics editors for Windows developed by Xara. Xara Photo & Graphic Designer has high usability compared to other similar products and has very fast rendering. Xara Photo & Graphic Designer (and earlier product ArtWorks) was the first vector graphics software product to provide fully antialiased display, advanced gradient fill and transparency tools. The current version supports multi-page documents, and includes a capable integrated photo tool making it an option for any sort of DTP work. The Pro version includes extra features such as Pantone and color separation support, as well as comprehensive web page design features.
- Xara Xtreme LX is a partially open source version of Xara Photo & Graphic Designer for Linux.
- Xfig is an Xlib, open source editor started by Supoj Sutanthavibul in 1985, and maintained by various people. It has a technical library. Its advantage is support for exporting of the TeX friendly files containing code for LaTeX (pict2e and epic/eepic macros packages), PGF/TikZ, PStricks, graphs and picture drawing scripts that allow inclusion of complicated graphics into various document formats (e.g. PDF).

== General information ==
This table gives basic general information about the different vector graphics editors:

Software	Company or author	First released	Latest version	Date	Cost (USD)	License
Adobe Illustrator	Adobe Systems	1987	CC 2024 (28.4.1)	2024-04-1	$19.99 / month (1 year contract) or $29.99 / month	Proprietary
Affinity	Canva	2025	3.0.0	2025-10-30	Free for basic features. Subscription needed for Canva AI features.	Proprietary
Affinity Designer (Before Affinity 3.0)	Serif Europe	2014	2.6.2	2022-11-08	$49.99 Windows and $19.99 for iPad	Proprietary
Apache OpenOffice Draw	Apache Software Foundation	2000	4.1.10	2021-05-04	No cost	Apache-2.0
Boxy SVG	Jarosław Foksa	2013	3.42.4	2020-08	$9.99 in app stores or $9.99 monthly subscription	Proprietary
Collabora Online Draw All: Online, Mobile and Desktop apps	Collabora Productivity	2016	26.04.3.3	2026-09-14	No cost when using the Collabora Online Development Edition (CODE). For enterprise support 17 Euro per user, per year, up to 99 users, then discounts apply.	MPL-2.0
ConceptDraw PRO new: ConceptDraw Diagram	CS Odessa	1999	14	2020-10	$199	Proprietary
CorelDRAW	Corel	1989	2021 (23)	2021-03-09	$499 or $249 annual subscription (includes Photopaint)	Proprietary
Dia	The GNOME Project	1998	0.97.3	2014-09-05	No cost	GPL-2.0-or-later
DrawPlus	Serif Europe	1994	X8	2015-03-23	$119.99	Proprietary
Edraw Max	EdrawSoft	2004	9.4	2020-03	No cost, $99 premium subscription	Proprietary
Embroidermodder	Embroidermodder Team	2004	1.70	2012	No cost	v2: Zlib v1: GPL-2.0
EazyDraw	Dekorra Optics	2003	9.5.2 (2020-01), 1.1.0 iOS	2020-01	$95 (trial version available at no cost; other prices)	Proprietary
Figma	Figma	2016	2020-05-19	2020-05-19	No cost, $12, and $45 monthly subscription tiers	Proprietary (freemium)
GodSVG	MewPurPur	2023	1.0-alpha15	2026-03-27	No cost	MIT
Google Drawings	Google	2010-04-12			No cost	Proprietary
Karbon	KDE Calligra Suite (CS)	2012	3.2.0 CS 3.2.2	2020-04-19	No cost	LGPL-2.0-or-later
Inkscape	Inkscape Team	2003	1.4.4	2026-05-06	No cost	GPL-3.0-or-later
LibreOffice Draw	The Document Foundation	2011	25.2.3.2	2025-04-30	No cost	MPL-2.0
Macromedia FreeHand	Adobe Systems	1988	MX (11)	2003	$399, $99 upgrade	Proprietary
Microsoft Visio	Microsoft	1992	16.0	2019	$560, $350 upgrade (Pro), $260, $130 upgrade (Standard)	Proprietary
OmniGraffle	The Omni Group	2000	7.18.1 (2020-12-13) for OS X, 3.15.3 for iOS (2020-12-13)	2020-12-13	Standard: $99, Pro: $199, iPad $49 (Pro: $99)	Proprietary
Penpot	Kaleidos	2021	2.8.1	2026-09-22	No cost	MPL-2.0
Pencil2D	Pascal Naidon, Patrick Corrieri	2005	0.6.6	2021-02-17	No cost	GPL-2.0-only
PhotoLine	Computerinsel GmbH	1995	24.01	2023-12-20	€59, €29 upgrade	Proprietary
SaviDraw	Silicon Beach Software	2019	1.1	2019-06	$19.99	Proprietary
sK1	sK1 Project Team	2009	2.0RC4	2019-05-27	No cost	GPL-3.0-or-later
Sketch	Bohemian Coding	2010	70.6	2021-02-23	$99	Proprietary
SVG-edit	The SVG-edit community	2009	5.1.0	2019-11-16	No cost	MIT
Synfig	Synfig Team	2005	1.4.1	2021-05-09	No cost	GPL-2.0-or-later
VectorStyler	Numeric Path	2021	1.0.029 RC3	2021	$95 USD; one-time payment	Proprietary
WinFIG	winfig Team	2003	2021.1	2021-01-31	$35	Proprietary
Xara Designer Pro+	Xara	1995	2020	2018-10	$299.00	Proprietary
Xfig	Xfig Team	1985	3.2.8a	2021-03-27	No cost	xfig
Software	Company	First released	Latest version	Date	Cost (USD)	License

== Operating system support ==
This table lists the operating systems that different editors can run on without emulation:

Software	Windows	macOS	Unix and Linux	iOS	Android
Adobe Illustrator	Yes	Yes	Dropped (v 5.5)	Yes (iPad)	No
Affinity Designer	Yes	Yes	No	Yes (iPad)	No
Apache OpenOffice Draw	Yes	Yes	Yes	No	No
Aviary	Yes	Yes	Yes	No	Yes
Boxy SVG	Yes	Yes	Yes	No	Yes
Collabora Online Draw	Yes	Yes	Yes	Yes (6.4.7+) and iPadOS	Yes (6.4.7+) and ChromeOS
ConceptDraw PRO	Yes	Yes	No	No	No
CorelDRAW	Yes	Yes	Dropped (v. 9)	No	No
Dia	Yes	Yes	Yes	No	No
DrawPlus	Yes	No	No	No	No
EazyDraw	No	Yes	No	Yes	No
Edraw Max	Yes	Yes	Yes	No	No
Figma	Yes	Yes	Web only	Companion app only	Companion app only
Google Drawings	Yes	Yes	Yes	No	Yes
Inkscape	Yes	Yes	Yes	No	No
LibreOffice Draw	Yes	Yes	Yes	under development (available mostly in Collabora Online Draw 6.4.7+)	under development (available mostly in Collabora Online Draw 6.4.7+)
Macromedia Freehand	Yes	Yes	No	No	No
Microsoft Expression Design	Yes	No	No	No	No
Microsoft Visio	Yes	No	No	No	No
OmniGraffle	No	Yes	No	Yes (iPad)	No
PhotoLine	Yes	Yes	No	No	No
SaviDraw	Yes	No	No	No	No
sK1	Yes	Yes (user must compile)	Yes	No	No
Sketch	No	Yes	No	No	No
Sodipodi	Yes	No	Yes	No	No
SVG-edit	Yes	Yes	Yes	No	No
Synfig	Yes	Yes	Yes	No	No
VectorStyler	Yes	Yes	No	No	No
WinFIG	Yes	Yes	Yes	No	No
Xara Designer Pro+	Yes	No	No	No	No
Xara Xtreme LX	Yes Windows 10 with WSL	No	Yes	No	No
Xfig	Yes Windows 10 with WSL	Yes Compiler?	Yes	No	No
Software	Windows	macOS	Unix and Linux	iOS	Android

== Basic features ==
Software	Maximum page size	Maximum zoom	Color management for print	Scripting support
Adobe Illustrator	5.7785 × 5.7785 m	64000%	Yes	Yes
Affinity Designer	No maximum size.	1000000%	Yes	No
Apache OpenOffice Draw	119 × 119 cm	3000%	No	Yes
Aviary	?	400%	No	No
Boxy SVG	?	6000%	No	No
Collabora Online	600 × 600 cm	3000%	Yes	Yes
ConceptDraw PRO	Screen resolution	Page width	No	Yes (Note: ConceptDraw Basic Script only)
CorelDRAW	45.72 × 45.72 m	260000% (estimated)	Yes	Yes
DrawPlus	10,000 × 10,000 cm	5000%	Yes	Yes (Note: ActionScript only)
EazyDraw	250,000 × 250,000 m	250000%	Yes	No
Edraw Max	Screen resolution	400%	No	Yes
Embroidermodder	?	?	No	Yes
Fatpaint	8000 × 8000 px	Depend on the page size.	No	No
Google Drawings				
Inkscape	1000 × 1000 km	25600%	No (export svg to 3rd party)	Yes
LibreOffice Draw	600 × 600 cm	3000%	Yes	Yes
Macromedia Freehand	5.6388 × 5.6388 m	25600%	Yes	Yes
Microsoft Visio	2147483647 sq. in.	3098%	No	Yes
OmniGraffle	2,147,483,648 × 2,147,483,648 km	800%	Yes	Yes
PhotoLine	1,400,000,000 × 1,400,000,000 px	25600%	Yes	Yes
sK1	3000 × 3000 m	300000%	Yes	Yes
SVG-edit	? px	10000%	No	Yes
Xara Photo & Graphic Designer	2.75 × 2.75 m	25601%	Yes	No
Software	Maximum page size	Maximum zoom	Color management for print	Scripting support

== File format support ==
=== Import ===
Software	AI	CDR	ODG	PS/EPS	PDF	SVG	SWF	DXF	WMF/EMF	XAML	VSDX
Adobe Illustrator	Native	Partial	No	Yes	Yes	Yes	No	Yes	Yes		
Affinity Designer	Yes	No	No	Yes	Yes	Yes	No	Yes	Yes	No	No
Apache OpenOffice Draw	No	No	Native	Yes	Partial (Note: Via an extension)	Partial	No	Yes	Yes		
Aviary	No	No	No	No	No	Yes	No	No	No		
Boxy SVG	Partial	No	No	No	Yes	Native	No	No	No	No	No
Collabora Online Draw	Partial	Yes	Native	Yes	Yes	Yes	No	Yes	Yes		Yes
ConceptDraw PRO	No	No	No	No	No	No	No	No	Yes	No	
CorelDRAW	Yes	Native	No	Yes	Yes	Partial (Note: Not all features are supported. Some Inkscape-generated plain SVG files yield corrupted results)	No	Yes	Yes	No	
Dia	No	No	No	No	No	Yes	No	Yes	Yes	No	
DrawPlus	Yes	No	No	Yes	Yes	Yes	No	Yes	Yes	No	
EazyDraw	No	No	No	Yes	Yes	Yes	No	Yes	No	No	No
Embroidermodder	No	No	No	No	No	Partial	No	Partial	No		
Fatpaint	No	No	No	No	No	No	No	No	No	No	
Google Drawings	No	No	No	No	No	No	No	No	No	No	
Inkscape	Yes	Partial (Note: Via an extension using UniConvertor. Text elements not converted)	No	Yes (Note: Via an extension using Ghostscript)	Yes	Native	No	Yes	Yes (Note: Via an extension using UniConvertor)	Partial	Yes
Karbon	No	No	Yes	Yes	No	Yes	No	No	Yes		
LibreOffice Draw	Partial	Yes	Native	Yes	Yes	Yes	No	Yes	Yes		Yes
Macromedia Freehand	Yes	Partial	No	Yes	Yes	No	Yes	Yes	No	No	
Microsoft Expression Design	Partial	No	No	Yes	No	No	No	No	Yes	No	
Microsoft Visio 2002	Yes	Partial	No	Yes	No	No	No	Yes	Yes		
Microsoft Visio 2003	No	No	No	No	No	Yes	No	Yes	Yes		
Microsoft Visio 2013	No	No	No	No	No	Yes	No	Yes	Yes		Native
OmniGraffle	No	No	No	No	Yes	No (Note: It can export to SVG but cannot import from SVG)	No	No	No		Yes
PhotoLine	Yes	No	No	Yes	Yes	Yes	Yes	Yes	Yes		
SaviDraw	No	No	No	No	No	Native	No	No	No	Yes	
sK1	Yes (Note: AI postscript-based up to 9 ver.)	Yes	No	Yes	Yes	Yes	No	Yes	Yes		
Sodipodi	No	No	No	No	No	Yes	No	No	No		
SVG-edit	No	No	No	No	No	Yes	No	No	No	No	
Synfig	No	No	No	No	No	Partial (Note: Only SVG 1.0 Specification is supported since Synfig 0.62.00)	No	No	No		
VectorStyler	Yes	No	No	Yes	Yes	Yes	No	No	No	No	No
Xara Designer Pro +	Yes (Note: Imports only up to version 8.0 AI files, newer AI file versions needs to save as "AI (V8.0)" or PDF files)	No	Yes	Yes	Yes	Yes	No	Yes			
Xara Xtreme LX	Partial	No	No	Yes	Yes	Partial	No	No	No		
Software	AI	CDR	ODG	PS/EPS	PDF	SVG	SWF	DXF	WMF/EMF	XAML	VSDX

== See also ==
- Comparison of 3D computer graphics software
- Comparison of graphics file formats
- Raster graphics
  - Comparison of raster-to-vector conversion software
  - Comparison of raster graphics editors
- List of 2D graphics software
- Vector graphics
