= List of 2D graphics software =

List of notable 2D graphics software

This is a list of 2D graphics software.

== List ==
List of 2D graphics software
Software	Developer	Operating Systems	License
Acorn	Flying Meat Inc.	macOS	Proprietary
Adobe Animate	Adobe Inc.	Windows	Proprietary
Adobe Illustrator	Adobe Inc.	Windows, macOS	Proprietary
Adobe PhotoShop	Adobe	Windows, macOS, iOS, Android	Proprietary
Adobe Express	Adobe	iOS, Android	Proprietary
Adobe Fresco	Adobe	iOS, iPadOS, Windows	Freemium
Adobe InDesign	Adobe	Windows, macOS	Proprietary
Affinity	Canva and Serif	iPadOS, macOS, Windows	Freemium
Artipic	Artipic AB	Windows, macOS	Proprietary
ArtRage	Ambient Design	Windows, macOS, iOS, Android	Proprietary
Artweaver	Boris Eyrich Software	Windows	Freeware
Aseprite	Igara Studio S.A.	Windows, macOS, Linux	Proprietary
Bloom Image Editor	Sad Cat Software	Windows, macOS, Linux	Proprietary
Canvas X	Canvas GFX	Windows, macOS	Proprietary
Chasys Photo	John Paul Chacha's Lab	Windows	Freeware
CinePaint	The CinePaint Project	Linux, Unix-like, macOS, Windows	GNU GPL 2.0
Clip Studio Paint	Celsys	Windows, macOS, iPadOS, iOS, Android	Proprietary
CorelDRAW	Alludo	Windows	Proprietary
Corel Painter	Alludo	Windows, macOS	Proprietary
Corel Photo-Paint	Corel	Windows	Proprietary
Blender	Blender Foundation	Linux, macOS, Windows, BSD, Haiku	GPL 2.0
Canva	Canva Inc.	Web application	Proprietary
Deluxe Paint	Electronic Arts	AmigaOS, MS-DOS	Proprietary
Fatpaint	Fatpaint Software	Windows, macOS, Linux	Free web app
FigJam	Figma	Web application	Proprietary
FireAlpaca	PGN Inc.	Windows, macOS, Linux	Freeware
FlipaClip	Visual Blasters LLC	Android, iOS, Windows, macOS, ChromeOS	Proprietary
GIMP	The GIMP Development Team	Windows, macOS, Linux	GPL
G'MIC	The G'MIC Team	Linux, macOS, Windows	GPL
GraphicConverter	Lemke Software GmbH	macOS	Proprietary
GraphicsMagick	GraphicsMagick Team	Windows, macOS, Linux	MIT License
Houdini	Side Effects Software Inc.	Linux, macOS, Windows	Proprietary
ImageMagick	ImageMagick Studio LLC	Windows, macOS, Linux	ImageMagick License
Inkscape	Inkscape Developers	Windows, macOS, Linux	GPL
Karbon	KDE	Windows, Unix-like	GPL 2.0
KolourPaint	KDE	Windows, Linux	GPL-2.0
Krita	Krita Foundation	Windows, macOS, Linux	GPL
LazPaint	LazPaint	Windows, MacOS, Linux	GPL-2.0
LibreOffice Draw	The Document Foundation	Windows, macOS, Linux	MPL-2.0
Medibang Paint	Medibang Inc.	Windows, macOS, Android, iOS	Freeware
Microsoft Paint	Microsoft	Windows	Proprietary
Moho	Lost Marble LLC	Windows, macOS	Proprietary
mtPaint	Martin W. Taylor	Windows, Linux	GPL-2.0
MyPaint	MyPaint Development Team	Windows, macOS, Linux	GPL
openCanvas	P.I. Engineering	Windows	Proprietary
Paint.NET	Rick Brewster, dotPDN LLC	Windows	Freemium
Paint Tool SAI	Systemax Software	Windows	Proprietary
PaintShop Pro	Corel	Windows	Proprietary
Pencil2D	Pencil2D	Windows, macOS, Unix-like	GPL-2.0
PhotoLine	Computerinsel GmbH	Windows, macOS, Linux/Wine	Proprietary
Photopea	Ivan Kutskir	Web application	Proprietary
Pinta	Pinta Project	Windows, macOS, Linux	MIT
Pixia	Isao Maruoka	Windows	Freeware
Pixlr	Inmagine Group	Web-based, Windows, macOS, Android, iOS	Freeware
Pixelmator Pro	Apple	macOS	Proprietary
Procreate	Savage Interactive	iOS and iPadOS	Proprietary
Project Dogwaffle	Dan Ritchie	Windows	Proprietary
QuarkXPress	Quark, Inc.	Windows, macOS	Proprietary
Recraft	Recraft, Inc.	Web application	Freemium
sK1	sK1 Team	Windows, Linux	GPL-3.0-or-later
Sketchbook	Autodesk	macOS, Windows, Android, iOS	Proprietary
Sketch	Sketch B.V.	macOS	Proprietary
SmartDraw	SmartDraw, LLC	Web application	Proprietary
SVG-edit	SVG-edit Team	Web-based	MIT License
Synfig	Synfig community	Linux, macOS, Windows	GNU GPL 2.0.
Tahoma2D		Windows, macOS, Linux	BSD 3-Clause
TVPaint Animation	TVPaint Développement	Windows, macOS, Linux, Android, AmigaOS	Proprietary
VistaCreate	Vistaprint	Web application	Proprietary
Xara Designer Pro+	Xara Group Ltd	Windows	Proprietary
Xfig	Xfig Team	Linux, FreeBSD, Solaris, Cygwin	Xfig License
Software	Developer	Operating Systems	License

- Proprietary
- Open source
- Freeware/Trialware

== See also ==
- 3D computer graphics
- Comparison of 3D computer graphics software
- Comparison of raster graphics editors
- Comparison of vector graphics editors
- List of 2D animation software
- List of digital art software
- Graphics tablet
- Vector graphics
- Raster graphics
- Post-production
- Character design
