= WinFIG =

Proprietary shareware vector graphics editor application

- WinFIG 7.7
- Developer: Andreas Schmidt
- Stable release: 2024.2 / March 10, 2024
- Written in: C++ using Qt (software)
- Operating system: Microsoft Windows, OS X, Linux
- Available in: English
- Type: Vector graphics editor
- License: Shareware
- Website: www.winfig.com

WinFIG is a proprietary shareware vector graphics editor application. The file format and rendering are as close to Xfig as possible, but the program takes advantage of Windows features like clipboard, printer preview, multiple documents etc.

As of 2011, WinFIG is under active development, with new features being added regularly.

== History ==
The first release was in March 2003 and based on the Amiga program AmiFIG by the same author, which is also an Xfig compatible vector drawing application. WinFIG was not created by porting the Xfig source code to Windows. It is an independent implementation.

Starting with release 4.0 WinFIG was ported from MFC to the Qt toolkit as the application framework and thereby enabling the first release of a Linux version.

After Version 7.8 the Version scheme changes to years with version 2021.1.

== Interface and usability ==
WinFIG is designed to provide a clear, efficient, and convenient graphical user interface. It allows working on multiple documents using an MDI user interface and provides unlimited undo and redo of actions.

== Features ==
=== Object creation ===
The basic types of objects in WinFIG are:

- Open and closed Splines
- Ellipses
- Polylines and Polygons
- Texts
- LaTeX formatted texts
- Arcs
- Images: PNG, GIF, JPEG, EPS and more
- Compound objects, which are hierarchical compositions of objects

Objects can have several attributes, which depend on the object type:

- Line width
- Line style
- Line cap style
- Line join style
- Arrows
- Outline color, fill color and fill pattern

=== Object manipulation ===
- move
- copy
- scale
- rotate
- align
- add/delete points from lines or splines
- copy object attributes
- Numerical input of point coordinates

=== Exports ===
WinFIG can export into various formats:

- Raster formats: GIF, JPEG, PNG, PPM, XBM, XPM, PCX, TIFF, SLD
- Formats for printed documents: PostScript, PDF, LaTeX, HP-GL (printer control language used by Hewlett-Packard plotters),
- Vector graphics formats: EPS, SVG, PSTricks, TPIC, PIC, CGM, Metafont, MetaPost, EMF, Tk.

=== Miscellaneous ===
- Winfig can handle smart links. A smart link is a moving connection from a source to a target object. It is established by connecting the end point of a line or spline to another object. The connecting line or spline segment follows the movements of the target object. Smart links are useful for diagrams, graphs etc.
- WinFIG can show a grid and provides several magnet modes for constraining editing operations to discrete coordinates.
- Objects can be organized in layers to control their Z-order. This is important to control overlapping of filled shapes.
- Object library: drawings can be stored in a special sub-folder in the program installation directory, which makes them available in the library dialog for easy reuse.

== See also ==
- Xfig
- List of vector graphics editors
- Comparison of vector graphics editors
