= Sodipodi =

Vector graphics editor

- Sodipodi logo

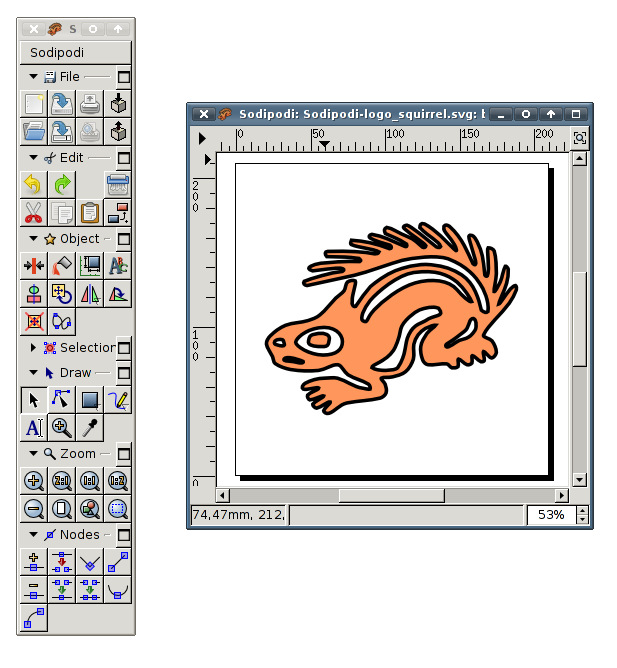
- Sodipodi running on Debian Linux
- Developer: Lauris Kaplinski
- Stable release: 0.34 / 11 February 2004; 21 years ago
- Repository: sourceforge.net
- Written in: C
- Operating system: Linux, Microsoft Windows
- Type: Vector graphics editor
- License: GNU General Public License
- Website: sodipodi.com at the Wayback Machine (archived 2007-08-29)

Sodipodi is a free and open-source vector graphics editor, superseded since 2003 by Inkscape, an independent Sodipodi fork.

== Development ==
Sodipodi started as a fork of Gill (abbreviated from "GNOME" and "illustration"), a vector-graphics program written by Raph Levien. The main author is Lauris Kaplinski, the son of the Estonian writer and poet Jaan Kaplinski, and later there were several other people who also contributed to the project.

Sodipodi means "mish mash" or "hodgepodge" in Estonian child-speak.

The primary design goal of Sodipodi was to produce a usable vector graphics editor, and a drawing tool for artists. Although it used SVG as its native file format (including some extensions to hold metadata), it was not intended to be a full implementation of the SVG standard. Sodipodi imports and exports plain SVG data, and can also export raster graphics in PNG format. The user interface of Sodipodi is a Controlled Single Document Interface (CSDI) similar to GIMP.

Sodipodi was developed for Linux and Microsoft Windows. The last stable version is 0.34 released on February 11th 2004. Released under the GNU General Public License, Sodipodi is free software.

Even though there are no new releases since 2004, Lauris Kaplinski continued development of Sodipodi for years in a minor way, mostly contributing code refactoring and bug fixes. The latest commit for the trunk branch was pushed on September 12th 2023.

== Derivatives ==
Sodipodi started a collection of SVG clip art containing symbols and flags from around the world. This work helped inspire the Open Clip Art Library.

In 2003 a group of Sodipodi developers decided to improve Sodipodi with different goals, including redesigning the interface and closer compliance with the SVG standard. The initial idea was to create a separate Sodipodi Hydra (hydra-oct) branch, planned to be merged into trunk, but as it was difficult to make such a merge developers later decided to create an independent fork and named it Inkscape.

== See also ==
- Comparison of vector graphics editors
- Skencil
- Xara Xtreme LX
