= Xfig =

Vector graphics editor for UNIX-like systems

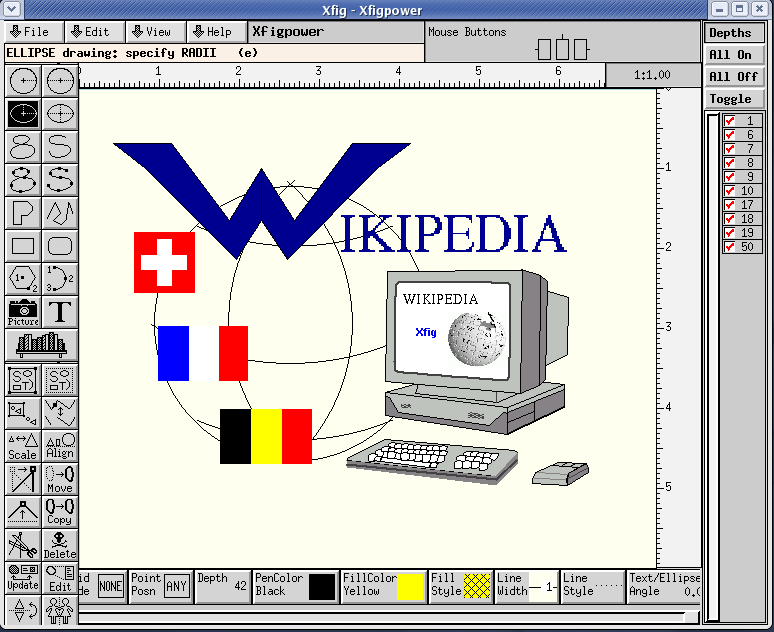
- Screenshot of Xfig with example drawings
- Initial release: 1985; 41 years ago
- Stable release: 3.2.9a / December 2024; 1 year ago
- Written in: C and Xlib
- Operating system: Linux, FreeBSD, Solaris, Cygwin
- Available in: English and Japanese
- Type: Vector graphics editor
- License: xfig
- Website: sourceforge.net/projects/mcj/
- Repository: git.code.sf.net/p/mcj/xfig

Xfig is a free and open-source vector graphics editor which runs under the X Window System on most UNIX-compatible platforms.

In Xfig, figures may be drawn using objects such as circles, boxes, lines, spline curves, text, etc. It is also possible to import images in a number of formats, including JPEG, EPS, PostScript, and SVG. Those objects can be created, deleted, moved or modified. Attributes such as colors or line styles can be selected in various ways. For text, 35 fonts are available.

Xfig saves figures in its native text-only "Fig" format. Xfig has a facility to print figures to a PostScript printer, too.
A convenient feature is the PSTricks or PGF/TikZ packages code that allows a smooth integration of Xfig-generated images into LaTeX documents. However, through the EPS export facility, figures can be imbedded into groff documents also, when rendered to PostScript, e.g. though grops.

Most operations in Xfig are performed using the mouse, but some operations may also be performed using keyboard accelerators (shortcuts). The interface is designed for a three-button mouse, although it is also possible to use a two-button or a one-button mouse with appropriate emulation, for example on a Macintosh under OS X.

== History ==
Xfig was written by Supoj Sutanthavibul in 1985 for SunView. Ken Yap ported xfig to X11. In 1989, Brian V. Smith added many features. In 1991, Paul King added many features including overhauling the GUI for version 2.0. In 1997, Tom Sato added Japanese text support, spell checker, and search/replace.

== Imports ==
Xfig can import various files as images:

- Raster formats: GIF, JPEG, PCX, PNG, PPM, TIFF, XBM, and XPM
- Vector graphics formats: EPS, PostScript

== Exports ==
Xfig can export into various formats:

- Raster formats: GIF, JPEG, PNG, PPM, XBM, XPM, PCX, TIFF, SLD
- Formats for printed documents: PostScript, PDF, HP-GL (printer control language used by Hewlett-Packard plotters),
- Vector graphics formats: EPS, SVG, PIC, CGM, Metafont, MetaPost, EMF, Tk
- LaTeX files: PGF/TikZ, PStricks

== See also ==
- Ipe – A modern vector graphics editor in the spirit of Xfig (including, e.g., LaTeX support).
- Tgif - An Xlib-based 2D vector drawing tool very similar to Xfig.
- Comparison of vector graphics editors
- WinFIG
