= PyX (vector graphics language) =

PyX is a Python package for the creation of PostScript, PDF, and static SVG files. It combines an abstraction of the PostScript drawing model with a TeX/LaTeX interface. Complex tasks like 2d and 3d plots in publication-ready quality are built out of these primitives. Its goals are similar to those of other metalanguages for PDF drawing, such as TikZ or Asymptote.

PyX is licensed under the GNU GPL version 2. It was originally the graphics library for Pyxplot. Although Pyxplot no longer depends directly on Pyx, it continues to incorporate substantial pieces of the PyX codebase.

== See also ==
- GeoGebra – free Dynamic Mathematics program with Asymptote export
- PSTricks
- TikZ
- Asymptote (vector graphics language)
