= CircuiTikZ =

TikZ add-on for typesetting circuit diagrams

Circuit diagram example drawn with CircuiTikZ

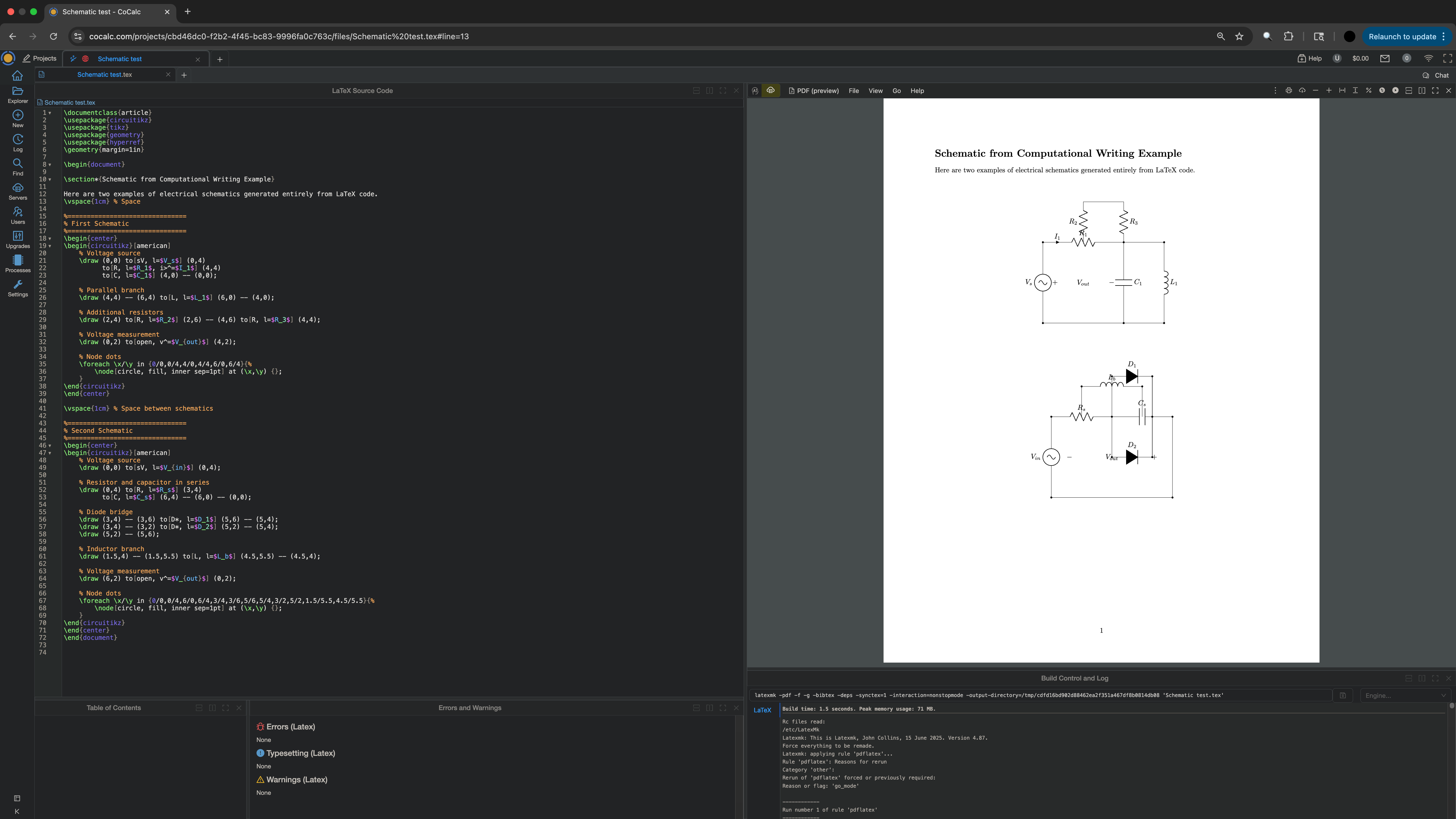
Electrical schematic diagram from CoCalc LaTeX using CircuiTikZ

CircuiTikZ is a TikZ add-on for typesetting circuit diagrams in a TeX environment such as LaTeX. It was started by Massimo Redaelli in 2007 when he had to create exams at the Polytechnic University of Milan as a research assistant. After he left University in 2010 the project began to stumble. From 2015 on the further development mainly takes place at the Institute for Electronics Engineering of the Friedrich-Alexander-Universität Erlangen-Nürnberg.

CircuiTikZ is widely used for publications and books in the academic environment of electronics.

CircuiTikZ is released under the LaTeX Project Public License and/or the GNU General Public License.

== See also ==
- PSTricks
- List of TeX extensions
