= LibreOffice Draw =

Vector graphics editing software

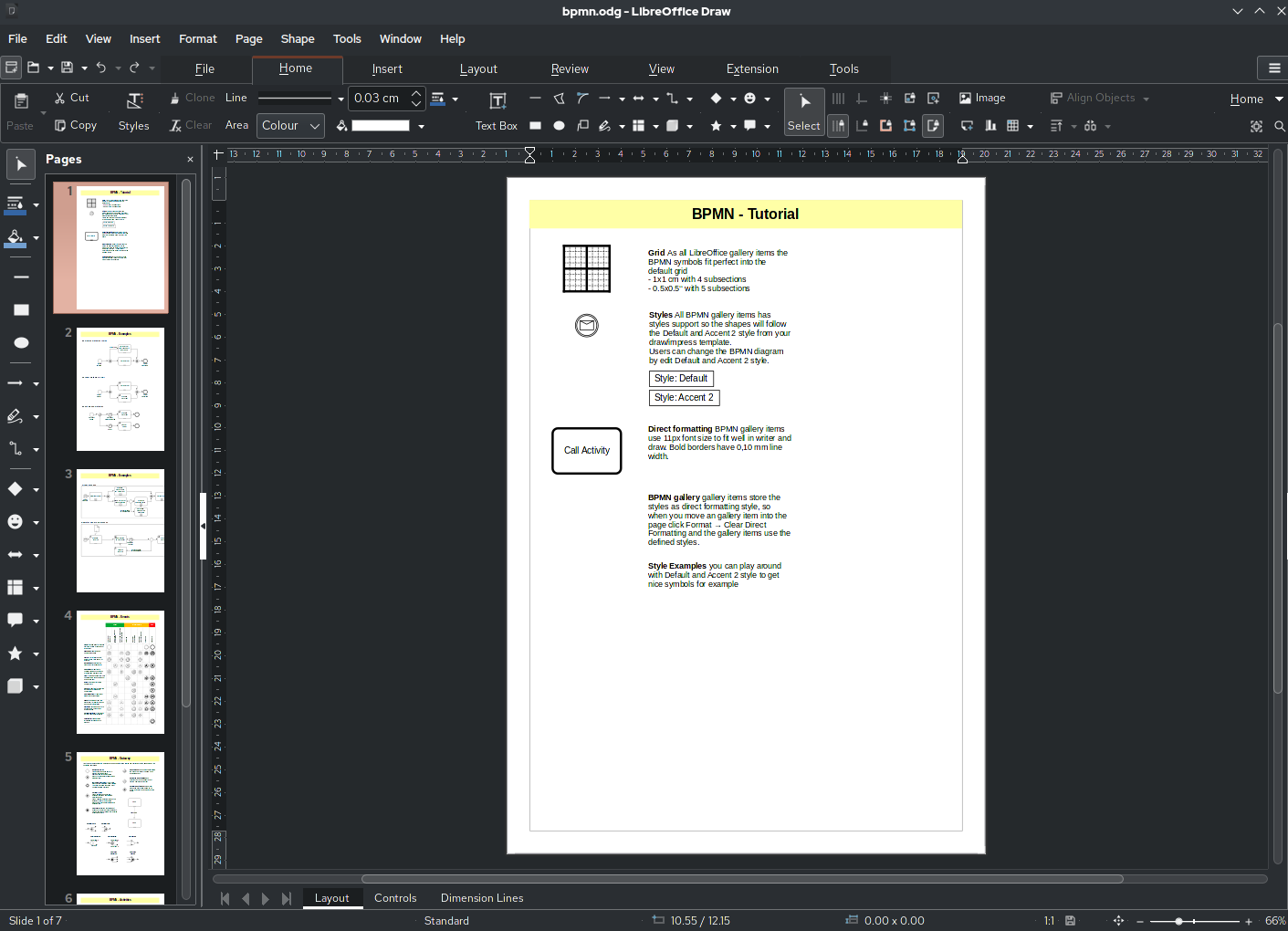
- LibreOffice Draw 7.2.4 (released in December 2021, running on Linux and KDE Plasma 5 with the Breeze icon set)
- Developer: The Document Foundation
- Release: January 25, 2011; 15 years ago

Stable release(s)
- Fresh: 26.8.3 / 12 November 2026; Still: 26.2.7 / 3 November 2026

Preview release(s)
- 27.2.0.0.alpha0 / 16 June 2026
- Operating system: Cross platform
- Type: Vector graphics editor
- License: MPL-2.0
- Website: libreoffice.org
- Repository: github.com/LibreOffice/core.git

LibreOffice Draw is a free and open source vector graphics editor. It is one of the applications included in the LibreOffice suite, developed by The Document Foundation. The software can be used to create complicated figures using shape tools, straight and curved tools, polygon tools, among other features.

Like the other components of LibreOffice, Draw can be run on Linux, macOS and Microsoft Windows. There are community builds for many other platforms. Ecosystem partner Collabora uses LibreOffice upstream code and also provide apps for Android, iOS, iPadOS and ChromeOS. On the other hand, LibreOffice Online is an online office suite which includes the applications Writer, Calc, Impress and Draw—which also provides an upstream for projects such as commercial Collabora Online.

LibreOffice Draw natively uses Open Document Format for Office Applications (ODF) (.odg graphics extension), which is an international standard file format established by the Organization for the Advancement of Structured Information Standards (OASIS).

== Features ==
The Draw app lets the user create flowcharts, technical drawings, brochures, posters, customized photos, photo galleries and albums.

Also, it includes features such as the spellchecker, autocorrect, thesaurus, hyphenation mode and color replacing. A gallery of shapes and drawings for options is also available. It also supports the macro execution with Java extensions and has configurable XML filter settings.

=== Import and export function ===
- Import, edit, export PDFs
- Import Microsoft Visio (.vsd) files
- Import Microsoft Publisher (.pub) files
- Import from OTT, STW, OTH, OTS, STC, OTP, STI, OTG, STD and VOR formats
- Export to BMP, EPS, GIF, JPEG, PNG, PSD, SVG, WMF, as well as create HTML, XHTML, PDF and SWF files

== Reception ==
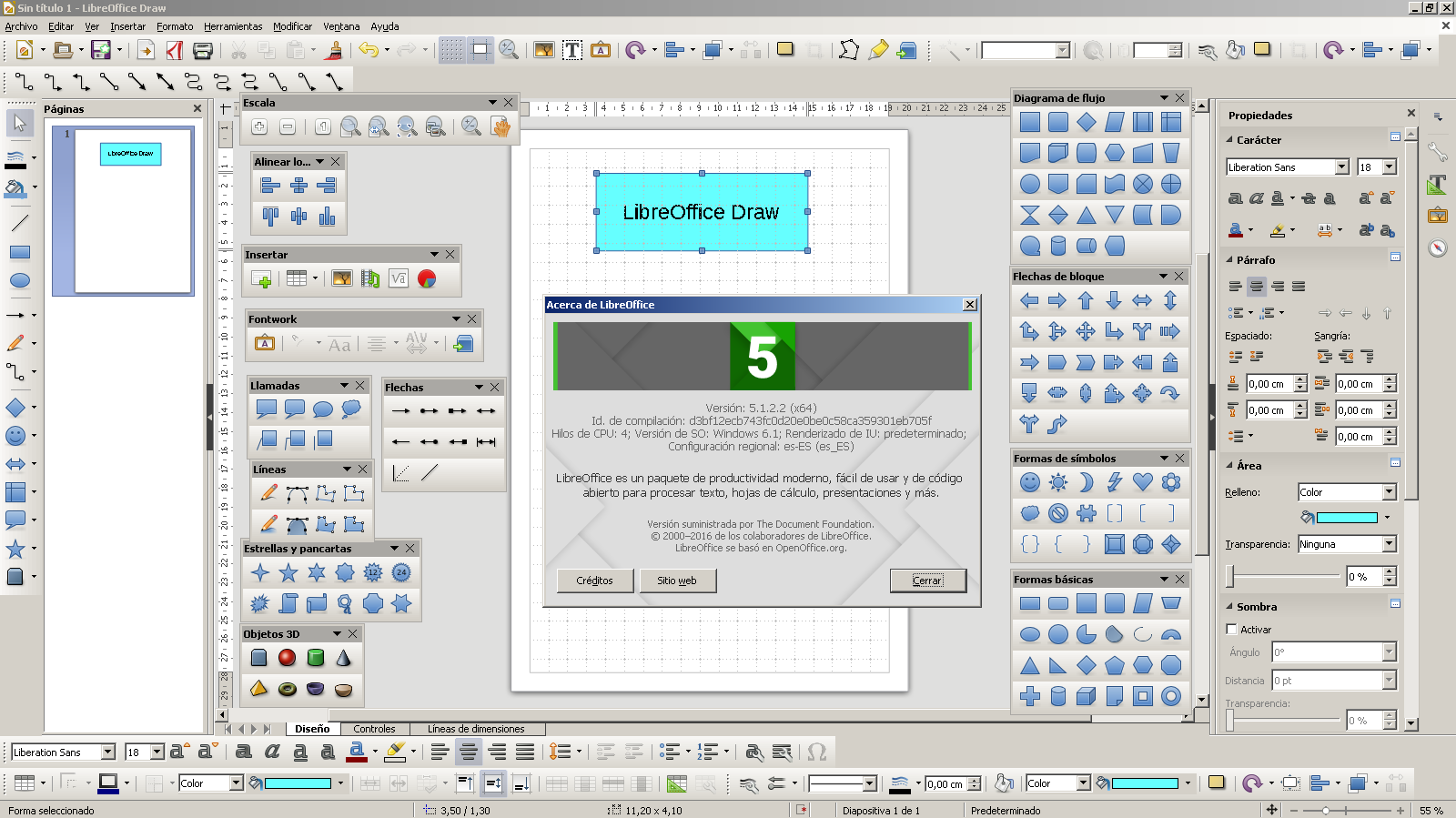
LibreOffice Draw 5.1.2.2

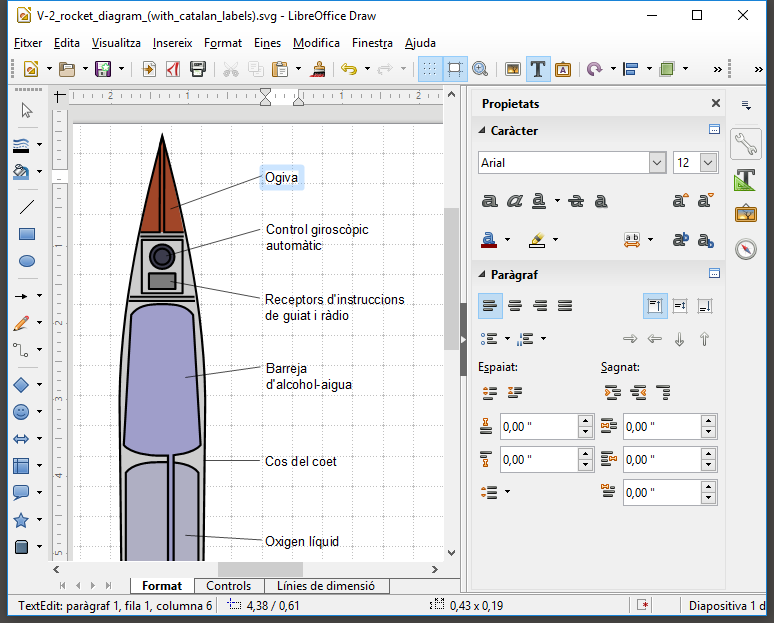
LibreOffice Draw 5.2

In a 2014 review, Elena Opris wrote in Softpedia, "The Good: LibreOffice's best features are applicable in all modules. Draw sports numerous options and configuration parameters for defining each part of the graphical plan as well as for the general elements in the interface (such as toolbars and keyboard shortcuts). The styles and formatting presets simplify the entire layout designing process. The document recovery feature usually comes to the rescue when experiencing system crashes." Opris noted, "The Bad: The program often takes a while to paste pictures as well as to load some features. It froze several times during our evaluation when inserting files with unsupported formats, which eventually led us to restarting Draw."

Writing in December 2017 for It's FOSS, Ankush Das, said, "LibreOffice Draw module is one of the best open source alternatives to Microsoft Visio. With the help of it, you can either choose to make a quick sketch of an idea or a complex professional floor plan for presentation. Flowcharts, organization charts, network diagrams, brochures, posters, and what not! All that without even requiring to spend a penny."

PAT Research described Draw in a 2018 review, "LibreOffice Draw is a powerful office and flowchart software that provides a clean interface and tools that enable users to unleash their creativity and enhance their productivity".

GoFree wrote, "it is simply amazing that a free vector graphics editor like this can deliver such professional results."

== See also ==
- Comparison of desktop publishing software
- List of desktop publishing software
