= Boxy SVG =

Vector graphics editor

- Boxy SVG v3.42.4
- Developer: Jarosław Foksa
- Initial release: March 15, 2013; 13 years ago
- Stable release: 4.70.0 / May 22, 2025; 10 months ago
- Written in: JavaScript
- Operating system: Windows, macOS, Linux, ChromeOS
- Type: Vector graphics editor
- License: Proprietary
- Website: https://boxy-svg.com

Boxy SVG is a proprietary vector graphics editor for creating illustrations, as well as logos, icons, and other elements of graphic design. It is primarily focused on editing drawings in the SVG file format. The program is available as both a web app and a desktop application for Windows, macOS, ChromeOS, and Linux-based operating systems.

== History ==
Boxy SVG was originally designed for macOS and written in both Objective-C and CoffeeScript. The first version was published on 2013-03-15 on the Mac App Store.

The second version, released on 2014-08-01, was a complete rewrite in JavaScript and Electron to make the application work as both a web app in a browser and a regular desktop application.

The third major release (2017-06-06) introduced a new user interface based on Xel, an HTML5 widget toolkit.

Afterwards, the developers switched to a shorter release cycle, with new versions rolled out every 1 or 2 months.

== Compatibility ==
The program uses SVG and SVGZ (zlib compressed version) as its native file formats. Some elements are in program's own namespace to either extend the feature set beyond what's available in the W3C SVG specification or provide a convenience layer for low-level details. Boxy SVG can also open SVG files authored with Inkscape and Adobe Illustrator, all software-specific elements and attributes will be dropped.

The application is based on the Electron framework and thus supports the same subset of the SVG format as Chromium-based web browsers such as Google Chrome, Microsoft Edge, and Opera. A major exception is the lack of support for animation. From version 4.58.0 it was added supports for Firefox as well.

Boxy SVG reads and writes PNG, JPEG, WebP, GIF, and PDF files, and reads Adobe Illustrator documents saved with the PDF compatibility mode on. Additionally, it can export HTML files.

== Features ==
- Markup inspection: The XML code of the SVG document can be viewed and edited directly in the Elements panel.
- Objects manipulation: General transformations such as moving, rotating, scaling, and skewing can be performed right on the canvas. Gradient and pattern fills can be customized using on-canvas handles.
- Shapes: In addition to tools for drawing basic geometric shapes, such as rectangles and ellipses, the program features tools for drawing procedural shapes like cogwheels and crosses. This is done by using a custom namespace to extend the SVG specification. All shapes can be edited directly on the canvas. Additionally, numeric control over size, position, and other aspects of objects is available in the Geometry panel.
- Path drawing tools: The program has dedicated tools for drawing quadratic (2nd order) and cubic (3rd order) splines, as well as an Arc tool to draw consecutive arcs in a single Bézier curve. Text along path is available.
- Reusable items: Boxy SVG can save colors, gradients, and patterns in the <defs> section of the SVG document so that multiple objects would be able to use the same fill definition and automatically update their look once that definition changes. The same principle applies to more elements like filters, markers, and fonts.
- Filters: The program has full support for SVG filter effects. It ships with a number of predefined filters such as Drop Shadow or Hue Rotation. New filters can be created with a graph-based filter designer.
- Bitmap tracing: Boxy SVG provides a Vectorize generator to trace bitmaps into Bézier curves with color fills depending on user-defined color quantization settings.
- Asset libraries: The program allows using fonts from Google Fonts, clip art and photos from Pixabay, and color swatches from the online service called Color Hunt.

== See also ==
- Comparison of vector graphics editors
- Scalable Vector Graphics
