= Sketch (software) =

Vector graphics editing software for MacOS

- Developer: Sketch B.V.
- Release: 7 September 2010; 15 years ago
- Stable release: 2025.2.2 / 15 September 2025
- Operating system: macOS
- Type: Vector graphics editor
- Licence: Proprietary
- Website: www.sketch.com

Sketch is a vector graphics editor for macOS developed by the Dutch company Sketch B.V. (formerly named Bohemian Coding). It was first released on 7 September 2010 and won an Apple Design Award in 2012. It also has a web application that allows users to share files online.

It is primarily used for user interface and user experience design of websites and mobile apps, and does not include print design features. Sketch has more recently added features for prototyping and collaboration. Being only available for macOS, third party software and handoff tools may be used to view Sketch designs on other platforms.

== Overview ==
Sketch is used mainly for designing the UI and UX of mobile apps and web. The files designed in Sketch are saved in its own .sketch file format, though the files can also be opened in Adobe Illustrator, Adobe Photoshop, and other programs. The designs can also be exported to raster or vector formats such as PNG, JPG, SVG, and PDF. The designs created in Sketch are utilized by app engineers to design mobile apps and by website developers to convert designs into websites.

Although Sketch was previously sold through the App Store, the developers pulled the app from the store in December 2015 and instead sold it through its own website. It cited Apple's strict technical guidelines, slow review process and lack of upgrade pricing as reasons for the decision. On 8 June 2016, it announced on its blog that it was switching to a new licensing system for Sketch. Licenses would allow users to receive updates for 1 year, after which they could continue using the last version published prior to the license expiring, or renew their license to continue receiving updates for another year.

== See also ==
- Comparison of vector graphics editors
- Figma
- Adobe XD
- List of 2D graphics software
