= OmniGraffle =

Diagramming and digital illustration application

- OmniGraffle 7 running on macOS High Sierra
- Developer: The Omni Group
- Release: May 7, 2001; 25 years ago
- Stable release: macOS: 7.26 (September 11, 2026; 20 days ago) [±]; iOS: 3.23 (September 11, 2026; 20 days ago) [±]
- Operating system: macOS, iOS
- Type: Charting software
- License: Proprietary
- Website: www.omnigroup.com/products/omnigraffle/

OmniGraffle is a diagramming and digital illustration application for macOS and iOS created by The Omni Group.

== Uses ==
OmniGraffle is used to create graphics and visuals. The application features several design tools, along with a drag-and-drop WYSIWYG interface and a notes function that annotate and create specification documentation for prototypes and mockups.

While OmniGraffle can produce graphics and visuals, it is often used as a tool to create content maps, screen flows, and wireframes. Visuals are often referred to as "graffles."

== Application resources and tools ==
OmniGraffle design tools include canvases, templates, stencils, vector drawings, and grid guides. Other features include auto layout and document management.

Canvases
Canvases are spaces where users can create shapes. Attributes to creating a canvas include canvas name, sizing options, grid and dimension selections, and diagram layout. Users may create and also share canvases and layers, with automatic updates available. This gives users the option to create layers once, toggle layers to appear on desired canvases, and update automatically if any changes occur.

Templates
Templates are OmniGraffle application resources. Template documents can be manipulated by users for their purposes. Some sample templates are preloaded and available for users. Users may also create, edit, and save templates for creating consistent graffles.

Stencils
Stencils are OmniGraffle application resources. Stencils are clip art files that serve as elements, such as icons or buttons, for OmniGraffle documents. Users can also create, share, download, and preview stencils online as well through OmniGraffle's Stenciltown or other stencil libraries, such as Graffletopia.

OmniGraffle documents are vectorial, and the app includes vector design tools.

OmniGraffle supports "smart guides" and snap-to-grid for object alignment. Other design features include artistic fill and stroke styles, text and shape scalability, path-following text, shape combinations, diagram styling, auto layout features for tree mapping, and documentation management.

OmniGraffle can be automated using OmniJS (a Javascript programming environment).

== Import and export ==
OmniGraffle supports file sharing and Visio support in its Pro distribution. All users can export their graffles to JPEG, BMP, EPS, GIF, HTML Images, SVG, Template, Stencil, PNG, OO3, TIFF, and PDF. Additionally, OmniGraffle Pro users can import dot/graphviz, Visio, SVG, PDF, Photoshop with layers, and Xcode.

== Competition ==
In many respects, OmniGraffle is similar to Microsoft Visio. The Pro version of OmniGraffle can both import and export Visio files created using Visio's XML export function. However, Omnigraffle doesn't provide CAD integration like Visio, since it lacks some features such as DWG or DXF (Autodesk file formats), import/export functions, among others. Also it is important to notice that layers cannot be shared among some versions of Visio and OmniGraffle.

Diagrams such as concept maps or mind maps, flowcharts and wire frames can also be drawn with other applications: see Comparison of vector graphics editors.
