= SVG-edit =

Browser vector graphics editor

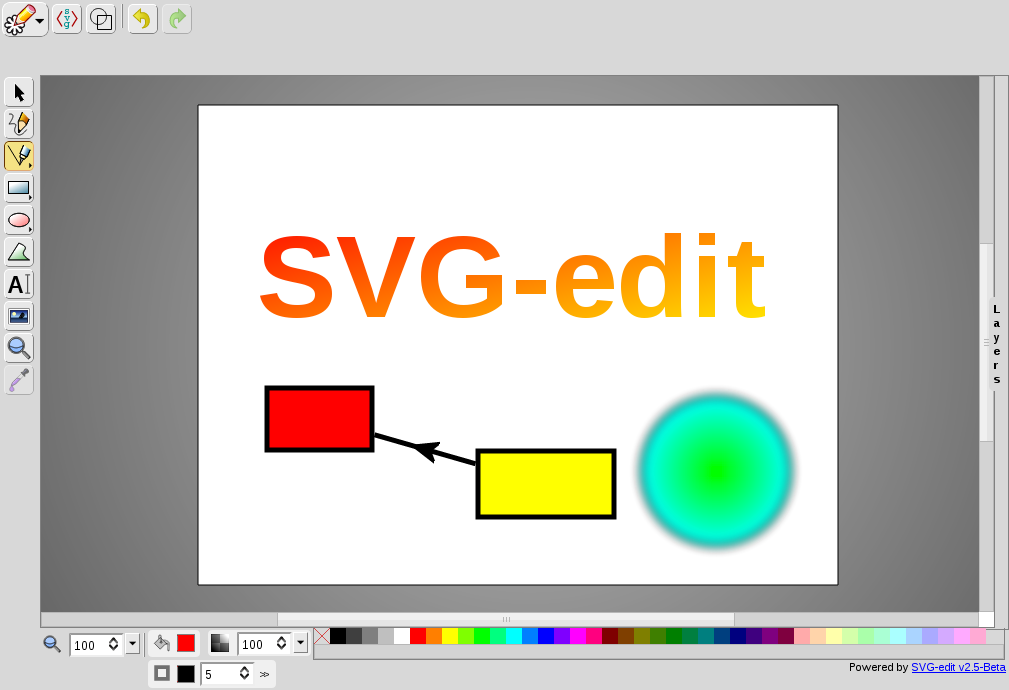
- Screenshot Screenshot of web based SVG-editor
- Developer: SVG-edit Team
- Initial release: February 6, 2009
- Stable release: 7.3.3 / December 10, 2023; 2 years ago
- Written in: JavaScript
- Operating system: Cross-platform
- Platform: Web browser
- Available in: Multilingual
- Type: Vector graphics editor
- License: MIT
- Website: svgedit.netlify.app
- Repository: github.com/SVG-Edit/svgedit

SVG-edit is a web-based free and open-source vector graphics editor. It can be used to create and edit Scalable Vector Graphics (SVG) images from within a web browser, not requiring additional software installation.

== Overview ==
SVG-edit is a cross-browser web-based, JavaScript-driven web tool, and has also been made into browser addons, such as an addon for Firefox, a Chrome extension, and a standalone widget for Opera. There's also an experimental SVG editing extension on MediaWiki that uses SVG-edit.

SVG-edit consists of two major components: svg-editor.js and svgcanvas.js. These components work cooperatively. File svgcanvas.js can be used outside of SVG-edit, allowing developers to create alternative interfaces to the canvas.

== Version history ==
SVG-edit was first announced by Narendra Sisodiya on 6 Feb 2009 in its minimal version. Version 2.0 was developed by Pavol Rusnak and released on 3 June 2009. The current stable release is 7.2.0.

== See also ==
- Comparison of vector graphics editors
