= PRC (file format) =

File format for 3D graphics

- Filename extension: .prc
- Internet media type: model/prc
- Developed by: ISO TC 171 SC 2
- Type of format: 3D visualization
- Contained by: PDF
- Standard: ISO 14739-1:2014
- Open format?: Yes

PRC (Product Representation Compact) is a file format that can be used to embed 3D data in a PDF file.

This highly compressed format facilitates the storage of different representations of a 3D model. For example, it is possible to save only a visual representation that consists of polygons (a tessellation), and it is also possible to save the model's exact geometry (B-rep data). Varying levels of compression can be applied to the 3D CAD data when it is converted to the PRC format using Adobe Acrobat 3D.

The 3D data stored in PRC format in a PDF is interoperable with Computer-Aided Manufacturing (CAM) and Computer-Aided Engineering (CAE) applications.

== History ==
The PRC file format was first presented by TTF (Trade and Technologies France) in 2003 at DMS in Tokyo. In 2006, the TTF company was acquired by Adobe Systems. In 2014, the PRC file format was approved as an international standard (ISO 14739-1:2014).

== Software to create PRC ==
- Adobe Acrobat "Pro Extended" 8 and 9.
- Adobe Acrobat X and XI with 3D PDF Converter from Tetra 4D.
- CrossCad/Ware from Datakit: SDK for developers to add PRC writing functionalities to their software.
- CrossManager from Datakit: Software to convert 3D formats to PRC.
- Feature Manipulation Engine.
- Geomagic Design.
- HOOPS Exchange libraries from Tech Soft 3D.
- PDF3D, version 2.0 and later.
- PROSTEP PDF Generator 3D.
- SOLIDWORKS allows saving of files to 3D PDF containing PRC since release 2015.
- 4D Publish, a plugin for Cinema 4D.

== Viewer ==
- Adobe Reader 8 and later
- nanoPRC demo viewer

== See also ==
- Portable Document Format
- Universal 3D
- Asymptote: Open Source PRC Writer
- nanoPRC: Open Source PRC parser and viewer
- glTF - a Khronos Group file format for 3D Scenes and models.
