= Penpot =

Online collaborative vector graphics editor

- Developer: Kaleidos
- Initial release: February 2021
- Stable release: 2.8.1 / August 1, 2025; 10 months ago
- Written in: Clojure
- Platform: Web application
- Type: Interface design
- License: Mozilla Public License
- Website: penpot.app
- Repository: github.com/penpot

Penpot is an open-source, collaborative web application for interface design. It is developed by Kaleidos, a Spanish company based in Madrid. The first alpha version was released on February 2, 2021, and was unveiled at FOSDEM 2021.

== See also ==
- Comparison of vector graphics editors
- Vector network
- Computer-aided software engineering
