= Xara Xtreme LX =

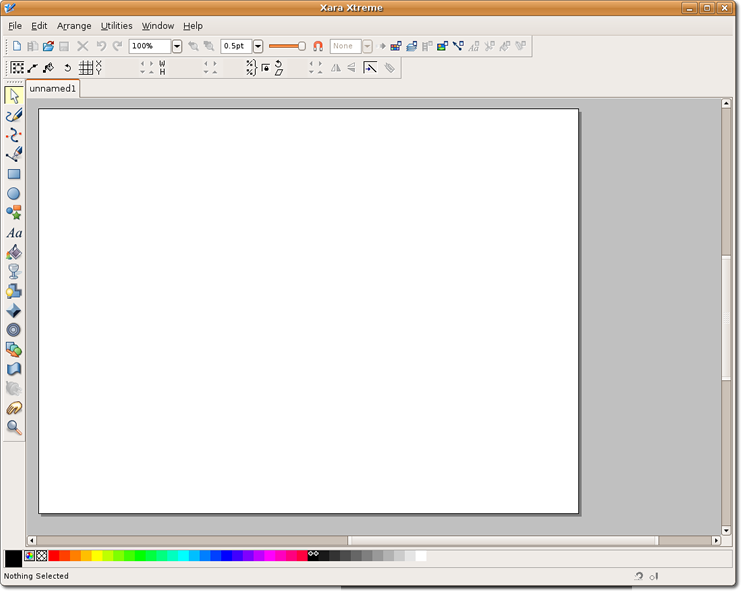
- Xara Xtreme for Linux running on Ubuntu
- Developer(s): Xara Group Ltd.
- Preview release: 0.7 / August 11, 2006; 19 years ago
- Repository: svn.xara.com/Trunk/XaraLX
- Operating system: Linux, Mac OS X
- Type: Vector graphics editor
- License: GNU GPL
- Website: xaraxtreme.org

Xara Xtreme LX is a discontinued 2D vector graphics editor, developed as an open source version of the commercial Xara Xtreme. The abbreviation LX stands for Xara Xtreme on Linux and was retained in some places such as the executable "xaralx".

== History ==
The first version was released for Linux in October 2005, and Xara Group Ltd announced it will release the source code of the trimmed down version under a free software licence, the GPL, and seek community help in porting it over to Linux and Mac OS X using the wxWidgets toolkit.

At the opening of the Libre Graphics Meeting 2006 in Lyon, France, Xara released most of the source code of Xara Xtreme for Linux in an updated website with details on how to access the sources. According to the Xara Xtreme for Linux homepage, the released source code contained "the majority of the Xara Xtreme source code" excluding the CDraw rendering engine, which would only be available in the form of static GCC libraries for a few selected CPU architectures. The 0.3 beta series allowed use of the .xar file format.

The last beta version was 0.7. The progress of the Linux version has stalled and the program's website has not been updated since August 2006. Xara Group Ltd's CEO, Charles Moir, confirmed on 15 February 2007 on the Xara developer mailing list that the CDraw source code wouldn't be released, "for a number of reasons, one significant reason being commercial risk outlined earlier" [on this list].

A new project, xarino, was created in December 2008, which provides access to the project's source code. A new mailing list was established in May 2009.

The community replaced the CDraw library with the open source Cairo library in May 2010.

There are forks maintained on GitHub. They include the latest XaraLx source version (last edits in 2007).
