= Fatpaint =

Graphic design software

Fatpaint is a free, online (web-based) graphic design and desktop publishing software product and image editor. It includes integrated tools for creating page layout, painting, coloring and editing pictures and photos, drawing vector images, using dingbat vector clipart, writing rich text, creating ray traced 3D text logos and displaying graphics on products from Zazzle that can be purchased or sold. Fatpaint integrates desktop publishing features with brush painting, vector drawing and custom printed products in a single Flash application. It supports the use of a pressure-sensitive pen tablet and allows the user to add images by searching Wikimedia, Picasa, Flickr, Google, Yahoo, Bing, and Fatpaint's own collection of public domain images. The completed project can be saved on Fatpaint's server or locally. Fatpaint is affiliated with Zazzle, and owned by Mersica (also the developer of MakeWebVideo).

== History ==
Fatpaint was launched in May 2010, after five years of development by Danish-Brazilian software developer, Mario Gomes Cavalcanti. After his departure, he was involved in the development of two of Denmark's most visited websites and is responsible for developing and running Fatpaint. Partner Kenneth Christensen mastered assembler and graphics programming on the Amiga computer. He spent years with Mario on the Amiga demo scene. According to the CEO, Kenneth helped him with the Linux servers while he handled the development, administration, promotion, video production, testing and content.

The founder of Fatpaint also created "Make Web Video" (or Video Maker), a web application for creating video presentations for businesses, families and individuals. Video Maker allows users to give out the videos for personal or business use in a simple and affordable way.

== Tools ==
Fatpaint provides free online logo maker, graphic design, vector drawing, photo editor and paint design in English, Danish and Portuguese.

=== Photo Editor ===
Users can change photo colours by manipulating R, G, B and A channels, saturation, contrast, brightness, hue, gamma, sharpness, tint and RGBA matrix. Users can also remove unwanted background and other artifacts by using the paint tools with added effects or by cloning. Multiple photos can be combined into a single image. Users can pick different blend modes and multiple layers. Users can also extract or change parts of the photo by cropping, resizing, skewing, bending, distorting and rotating in 2D and 3D. Hence, users' graphics can be printed on custom products that can be bought and sold for personal and business purposes.

=== Vector Drawing ===
Users can choose from 5000 vector images or draw vector graphics and art from scratch, using Fatpaint's vector shape creation tools. It also provides advanced symmetric vector transformation in 2D and 3D, as well as support for colour gradients. Multiple drawings can be combined to form complex vector shapes. Different blend modes and effects are supported. Vector drawings can be cropped, resized, skewed, distorted and rotated in 2D and 3D. Similar to Fatpaint's photo editor, vector graphics can be displayed on custom printed products that can be purchased and sold by the users for personal or business uses.

=== Paint Design ===
Fatpaint has full support for Pen Tablets and users can pick pen, brush, airbrush, paint bucket, clone painting, eraser and smudging tools. Fatpaint offers 8 palettes for painting, plus 13 palettes when clone painting. Fatpaint allows users to import or create their own brushes and thousands of free clipart drawings and brush sets that have dynamic brushes, effects and blend modes. Paintings can be combined in different layers and objects. Similarly, paintings can be cropped, resized, skewed, bent, distorted and rotated in 2D and 3D. Moreover, the graphics can be displayed on custom printed products, which users can buy or sell for personal or business uses.

== Top Features ==
- 3D Text objects: Create photorealistic, ray-traced 3D text logos and images.
- Image objects: Paint on multiple layers, import or create your own brushes, clone painting, and painting with effects.
- Vector drawing objects: Create vector images using multiple paths.
- Rich text objects with 981 fonts.
- Effect objects: Blur, Drop Shadow, Glow, Gradient Glow, Bevel, Gradient Bevel, Color manipulations.
- Page layout: Create multiple pages with a size limit of 64 megapixels, and arrange graphical objects on created pages (each object can be up to 7.8 megapixels in size).
- Nest graphical objects and transform them into 2D and 3D. Skew, bend and distort images and text.
- Design, purchase and sell custom-printed products. Fatpaint can send the projects to a printing company.
- Supports pressure-sensitive pen tablets.
- Fonts, public domain images, cliparts, and brushes.

== Compatibility ==
Fatpaint supports Firefox, Google Chrome, Opera, and Internet Explorer with cookies and JavaScript enabled. Other browsers may not work correctly due to their support of Java Applets. Fatpaint requires Adobe's Flash 10 or newer and Sun's Java 6 or newer. It is recommended to run on Windows 7 and on Apple and Linux if Java has been disabled. The editor only works on Firefox on Linux. Java and Flash integration do not work on Linux and Apple browsers. WikiMedia search is disabled on those browsers. Fatpaint works best with at least 2 GB RAM and 1 GB video memory, as well as a decent graphics card.
