= Synfig =

2D animation software

Synfig Studio

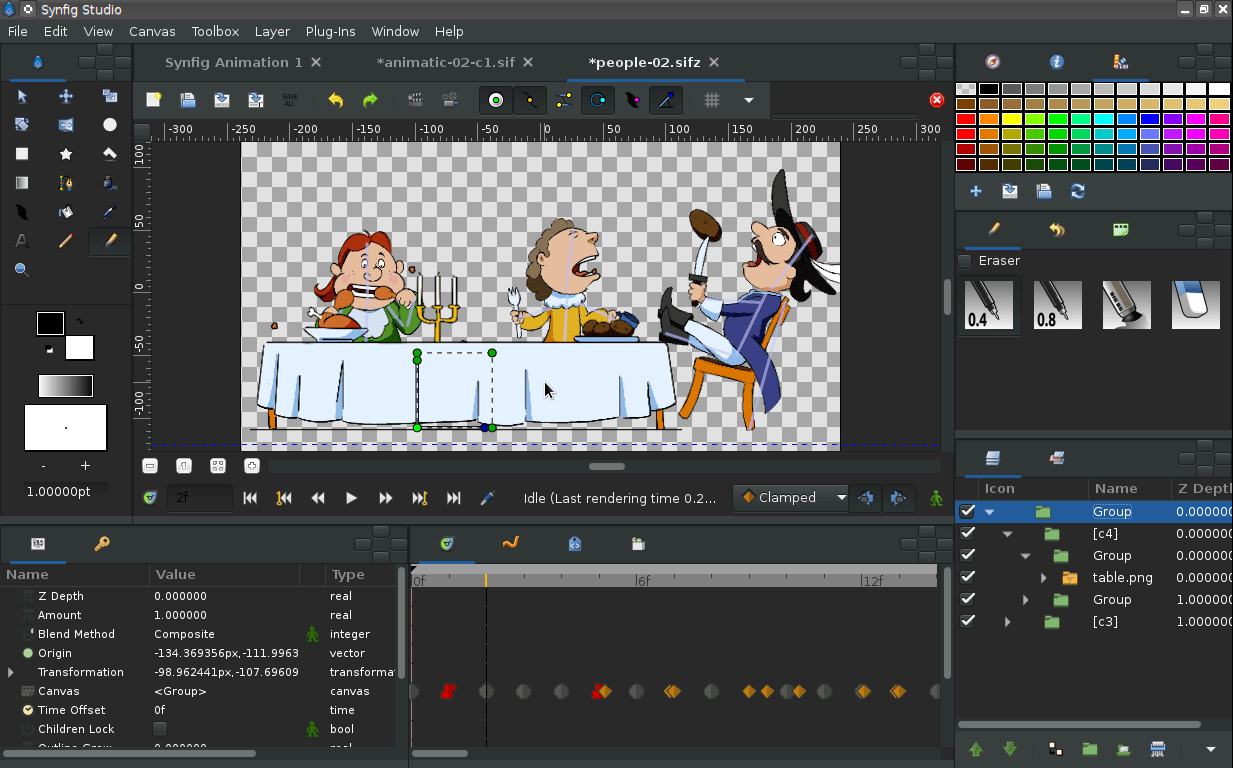
- Original author: Robert Quattlebaum
- Stable release: 1.4.5 / 19 May 2024
- Preview release: 1.5.5 / March 16, 2026; 26 days ago
- Written in: C++ (using gtkmm)
- Operating system: Linux, Mac OS X, Windows
- Type: Vector graphics editor, computer animation
- License: GPL-2.0-or-later
- Website: synfig.org
- Repository: github.com/synfig/synfig

Synfig Studio (also known as Synfig) is a free and open-source vector-based 2D animation software. It is created by Robert Quattlebaum with additional contributions by Adrian Bentley.

Synfig began as the custom animation platform for Voria Studios (now defunct), and in 2005 was released as free/open source software, under GNU GPL-2.0-or-later.

== Features ==
As a true front-end and back-end application, Synfig has the ability to design the animation in the front-end, Synfig Studio, and to render it at a later time with the backend, Synfig Tool, on another (potentially faster) computer without a graphical display connected. Incremental and parallel rendering with Synfig Tool is supported by some open source render farm management software, such as RenderChan.

The goal of the developers is to create a program that is capable of producing "feature-film quality animation with fewer people and resources". The program offers an alternative to manual tweening so that the animator does not have to draw each and every frame.

The software is capable of simulating soft-shading using curved gradients within an area so that the animator doesn't have to draw shading into every single frame. There is also a wide variety of other real-time effects that can be applied to layers or groups of layers like radial blurs, color tweaks that all are resolution-independent. Other features include the ability to control and animate the width of lines at their individual control points, and the ability to link any related data from one object to another. Synfig also works with High Dynamic Range Imaging.

== File formats ==
Synfig stores its animations in its own XML file format, often compressed with gzip. These files use the filename extension .sif (uncompressed), .sifz (compressed) or .sfg (zip container format). The files store vector graphics data, embed or reference external bitmap images, and also a revision history of the project.

Synfig can render to video formats such as AVI, Theora and MPEG, as well as animated graphics formats such as MNG and GIF. It can also render to a sequence of numbered image files, using formats such as PNG, BMP, PPM and OpenEXR.

From version 0.62.00, Synfig has basic support for SVG import.

From version 0.91 Inkscape can save as .sif file format.

== Morevna era ==
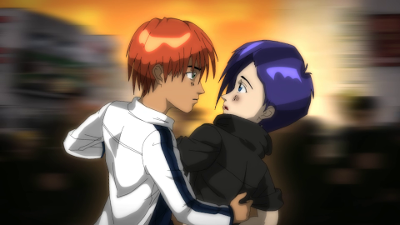
Morevna Project.

Much of the development of the tool since May 2008 has been in association with the Morevna Project, a Russian organization centered around an animation project using Synfig and other libre software and based on the folkloric characters of Ivan Tsarevich and Marya Morevna, specifically in the context of The Death of Koschei the Deathless re-invented as a science fiction anime. They have been making regular updates since then on the Morevna project site, including a demo video released on November 10, 2012 and several episodes of the Morevna story and of animatics based on the Pepper&Carrot webcomic. Free Software Magazine contained an article on the project.

== Name ==
It was originally called SINFG, a recursive acronym for "SINFG Is Not a Fractal Generator", referring to the software's capability of generating fractal imagery in addition to animation.

== See also ==
- List of 2D animation software
