= Encapsulated PostScript =

Graphics file format

- Filename extension: .eps; .epsf; .epsi
- Internet media type: application/postscript; application/eps; application/x-eps; image/eps; image/x-eps
- Type code: EPSF; TEXT
- Uniform Type Identifier (UTI): com.adobe.encapsulated-postscript
- Type of format: Vector image format
- Extended from: PostScript

Encapsulated PostScript (EPS) is a Document Structuring Convention (DSC)-conforming PostScript document format usable as a graphics file format. The format was developed as early as 1987 by John Warnock and Chuck Geschke, the founders of Adobe, together with Aldus. The basis of early versions of the Adobe Illustrator Artwork file format is formed by EPS together with the DSC Open Structuring Conventions.

In short, EPS files are self-contained, reasonably predictable PostScript documents that describe an image or drawing and can be placed within another PostScript document. An EPS file is essentially a PostScript program, saved as a single file that includes a low-resolution preview "encapsulated" within it, allowing some programs to display a preview on the screen. An EPS file contains a DSC comment describing the rectangle containing the image. Applications can use this information to lay out the page, even if they are unable to directly render the PostScript inside.

== Previews ==
EPS files frequently include a preview picture of the content for on-screen display. The idea is to allow a simple preview of the final output in any application that can draw a bitmap. Without this preview, the applications would have to directly render the PostScript (PS) data inside the EPS, which was beyond the capabilities of most machines that used PostScript.

When EPS was first implemented, the only machines widely using PostScript were Apple Macintoshes. These machines could not directly render the PostScript, which presented Adobe with the dilemma of how to provide a preview image for the designer while also including the PS version for the printer. On the Mac this turned out to be easy to solve, as the Mac file system included two parts (known as forks) that are logically referred to as one file. By placing the PostScript in the data fork and a standard Mac PICT resource in the resource fork, both images could be moved about together invisibly as if they were one file. While a PICT preview often contains a bitmap, it could also contain a vector representation of the whole image, providing very high quality previews.

Neither of these technologies is commonly used on any other operating system, however. When faced with the same problems on Microsoft Windows-based versions of their programs, Adobe chose to instead add a TIFF file encoded into the header section of the PostScript. Sometimes, although more rarely, they used the Windows Metafile (WMF) format instead. WMF has the potential to provide vector previews, similar to PICT on the Mac. Both of these PC format EPS files have a particular disadvantage: because the PostScript data, header, and preview are all in the same file, they will cause printing errors if a program does not understand the format well enough to extract only the PostScript data.

A fourth format known as a EPSI includes an ASCII-encoded preview bitmap. This format provides only black-and-white previews. It is mainly used on Unix-like systems. With several different ways of representing the preview, EPSI files have limited portability. An application that is unable to interpret an EPS file's preview will typically show an empty box on screen, but it will be able to print the file correctly. The most widely supported kind of preview is a Windows format preview with a TIFF.

== Vulnerability ==
Due to the ability to use embedded scripts, Microsoft removed support for EPS files in Microsoft Office programs in May 2018.

== See also ==
- Portable Document Format (PDF)
- Scalable Vector Graphics (SVG)
