= Vector graphics editor =

Type of application software

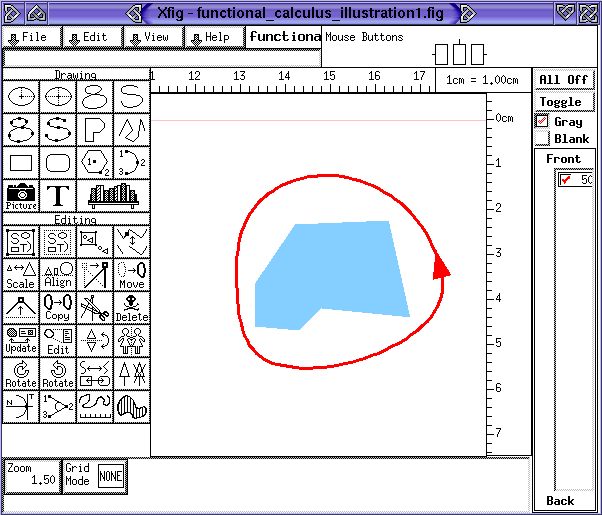
A screenshot of the xfig vector graphic editor

A vector graphic editor (sometimes called a vector manipulation program (Note: Based after the term Image Manipulation Program which in turn started with GIMP.)) is a computer program that enables its users to create, compose and edit images with the use of mathematical and geometrical commands rather than individual pixels. This software is used in creating high-definition vector graphic images that can be scaled indefinitely without losing their quality. The output is saved in vector graphic formats, such as EPS, ODG, or SVG.

== Vector editors versus bitmap editors ==
Vector editors are often contrasted with bitmap editors, and their capabilities complement each other. Vector editors are often better for page layout, typography, logos, sharp-edged artistic illustrations (e.g. cartoons, clip art, complex geometric patterns), technical illustrations, diagramming and flowcharting. Bitmap editors are more suitable for retouching, photo processing, photorealistic illustrations, collage, and illustrations drawn by hand with a pen tablet. Recent versions of bitmap editors such as GIMP and Adobe Photoshop support vector tools (e.g. editable paths), and vector editors have adopted raster effects that were once limited to bitmap editors (e.g. blurring).

== Specialized features ==
Some vector editors support animation, while others (e.g. Synfig Studio) are specifically geared towards producing animated graphics. Generally, vector graphics are more suitable for animation, though there are raster-based animation tools as well.

3D computer graphics software such as Maya, Blender or Autodesk 3ds Max can also be thought of as an extension of the traditional 2D vector editors, as they share some common concepts and tools.

== See also ==
- Vector graphics
- Comparison of vector graphics editors
- Raster graphics editor
- Image editing
- Graphics
- MetaPost
