= Creative Commons–licensed content directories =

Archives of works licensed under Creative Commons

Creative Commons is maintaining a content directory wiki of organizations and projects using Creative Commons licenses. On its website CC also provides case studies of projects using CC licenses across the world. CC licensed content can also be accessed through a number of content directories and search engines.

- ccHost - Server web software used by ccMixter and Open Clip Art Library
- Common Content - now offline (accessed 16 November 2007).
- Creative Commons' Content Directories
- Creative Commons' Search Page
- Google Advanced Search - select an option under Usage Rights, to search for CC content
- Mozilla Firefox web browser with default Creative Commons search functionality
- Open Game Art - Sound and graphics repository intended for use in free software video games
- The Internet Archive - Project dedicated to maintaining an archive of multimedia resources, among which Creative Commons-licensed content
- Yahoo's Creative Commons Search

== News and media ==
- The Conversation - Content is sourced from the academic and research community. Site content is under a Creative Commons — Attribution/No derivatives license.
- Aeon.co - Aeon ideas are interesting pieces and thought narratives re-publishable online or in print under their Creative Commons licence.
- Singularity Hub - Providing news coverage of sci/tech breakthroughs, certain articles can be republished for free in any language, online or in print, under the Creative Commons license CC BY-ND 4.0.
- ProPublica - A nonprofit newsroom that produces investigative journalism. Articles and graphics can be republished for free under CC BY-NC-ND 3.0 US.

== Audio and music ==
- CCMixter - A Creative Commons Remix community site
- Dogmazic - Archive of free music based in France, one of the main actor of free music movement in Europe
- Electrobel - A Creative Commons Community for Belgium, France, Netherlands, UK, Italy
- Jamendo - An archive of music albums under Creative Commons licenses
- Directory.Audio - A community collaborative, free database of sound effects, music and audio intros released under a Creative Commons license
- Newgrounds Audio portal - All the music submitted to the Newgrounds Audio portal is free to use under BY-NC-SA 3.0.

== Photos and images ==
- Newgrounds Art portal - Artists who submit art to the Newgrounds Art portal may choose to use a Creative Commons licence.
- Open Clip Art Library
- Pixabay - Provides public domain photos, illustrations, vector graphics, and film footage
- FreeSVG.org - Provides public domain (CC0) vector images in SVG format
- Creativevectors.org - Provides vector images with Creative Commons licences.
