= OpenGameArt.org =

Online repository intended for free software projects

Open Game Art
- Website type: Media Repository
- Available in: English
- Owner: Bart Kelsey
- Creator: Bart Kelsey
- Website: http://opengameart.org/
- Commercial: No
- Registration: Optional
- Launched: March 28, 2009
- Current status: Active
- Content license: Various Open content / Free Cultural Works licenses

Open Game Art is a media repository intended for use with free and open source software video game projects, offering open content assets.

Its purpose is to allow developers to easily replace programmer art with high-quality, freely licensed artwork. It accepts both 2D and 3D art, as well as sound effects and music, unlike similar projects such as ccMixter, which only deals with audio samples and songs, and The Freesound Project, which limits itself solely to samples.

== Content licensing ==
All content found on Open Game Art is licensed under free licenses. The project does not accept content licensed with clauses which prevent commercial reuse or remixing (like the Creative Commons license clauses NC or ND), as these are perceived to restrict users, thus making the content non-free.

The acceptable licenses currently are: the Creative Commons licenses "CC BY-SA 3.0" and "CC BY 3.0", the license "OGA-BY 3.0", which is based on the "CC BY 3.0" license but removing that license's technical restrictions (i.e. anti-DRM restrictions), the GNU licenses "GPLv2/GPLv3/LGPLv2/LGPLv3" and the Public domain like license "CC0". The latter is functionally equivalent to releasing content into the public domain, relinquishing as many rights as possible. Content under other highly permissive licenses such as the WTFPL or public domain-like licenses, should be relicensed as CC0 before being uploaded according to the site's FAQ. The website also allows co-licensing, that is, the uploading of assets under more than one license, similarly to Wikimedia Commons.

== Content ==
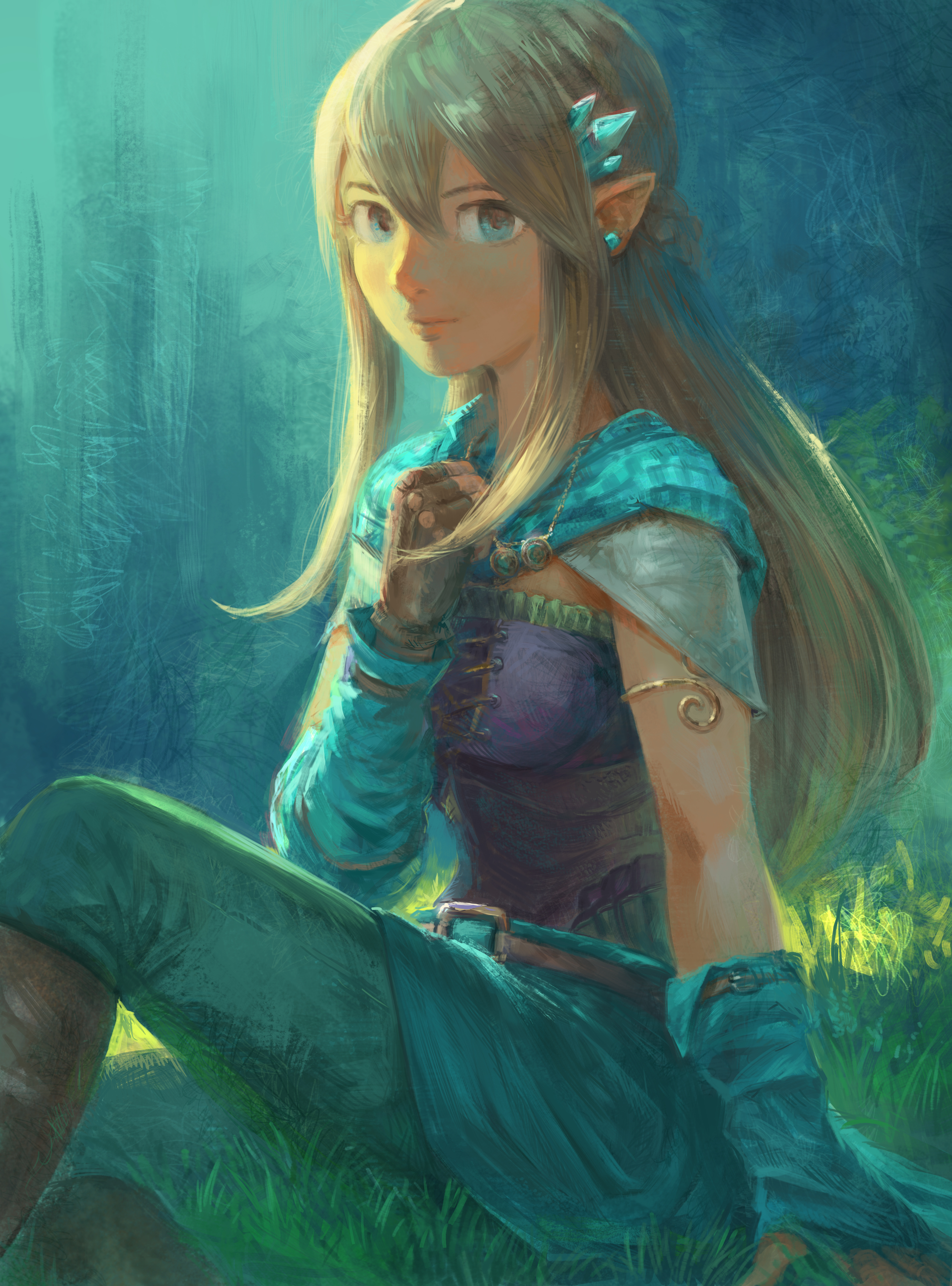
Sara is the mascot of Open Game Art. This interpretation of the character was made by David Revoy.

Being a repository for free content, much of the site's content is often created using free software such as GIMP, Inkscape, Krita and in particular, Blender.

Artists from the Warzone 2100, The Battle for Wesnoth and Frogatto projects, amongst others, have contributed assets. Portions of the collections of Quaternius and Kenny.nl are also included.

The site also has a section for articles and tutorials, as well as a discussion forum for its users.

== Operation ==
Hosting costs are currently paid for by the site operator. Donations are accepted through a PayPal account, and are used entirely to commission new artwork, with users being able to make requests as to what kind of artwork is commissioned.

OpenGameArt.org is also affiliated with related websites such as Libregamewiki, a database of purely libre games, the Free Gamer blog and the FreeGameDev forums.

=== Competitions and game jams ===
From June to July 2009, a pixel art contest was run to create clothes, hair and accessories for a pair of humanoid sprites that had been commissioned exclusively for Open Game Art. This subsequently evolved into the Liberated Pixel Cup (LPC), a project to create a unified set of Creative Commons artwork.

To stimulate new artistic contributions, the site also hosts an informal weekly competition called the Friday Challenge, wherein an artistic theme will be announced on a Friday, and entries will be voted on until a winner is decided nine days later.

Since 2017, the community has organised semi-regular seasonal game jams hosted on itch.io.
