= Create Project =

Web community for open source applications

The Create Project is a web-based community focused on communication and sharing between Free and Open Source Creative applications. Initially the project was created by freedesktop.org as a space for collaboration between free software creative projects, since then the project has become a full sub-project. Create now aims to develop and consolidate shared resources for creative applications. Several community-developed specifications have begun to be developed under the project such as OpenRaster and the Swatches colour file format.

Some of the many groups that come together under this project include Blender, GIMP, Inkscape, Scribus, Audacity, Open Clip Art Library, Open Font Library and the Aiki Framework which produce creative content, one of the major ways these groups come together is through the Libre Graphics Meeting which is hosted by the Create Project.

== Specifications ==
Specification	Status	Purpose
OpenRaster	In Development	OpenRaster is a raster graphics file format for non-final images, the aim is to provide a file format for working images that can be used in many raster graphics applications.
Swatches - colour file format	In Development	Aims to provide cross application support for color files.
Unified Plugin API	Being Discussed	A cross platform plugin API, so that raster graphics editors can share plugins.
User Interaction Comparisons	In Development	A central location for information for projects that work together under the create project that would allow users to more easily switch between said applications.
Open Color Standard	Being Discussed	A possible future open color standard
Resource Tagging	In Development	Cross application resource tagging

== See also ==
- Libre Graphics Meeting
- FreeDesktop.org
- Inkscape
- GIMP
- Scribus
- sK1
- Blender
- Audacity
- Open Clip Art Library
- Open Font Library
- Aiki Framework
- free and open-source software
- Open Source Developers' Conference
