= Medialab Matadero =

Cultural space and citizen lab in Madrid, Spain

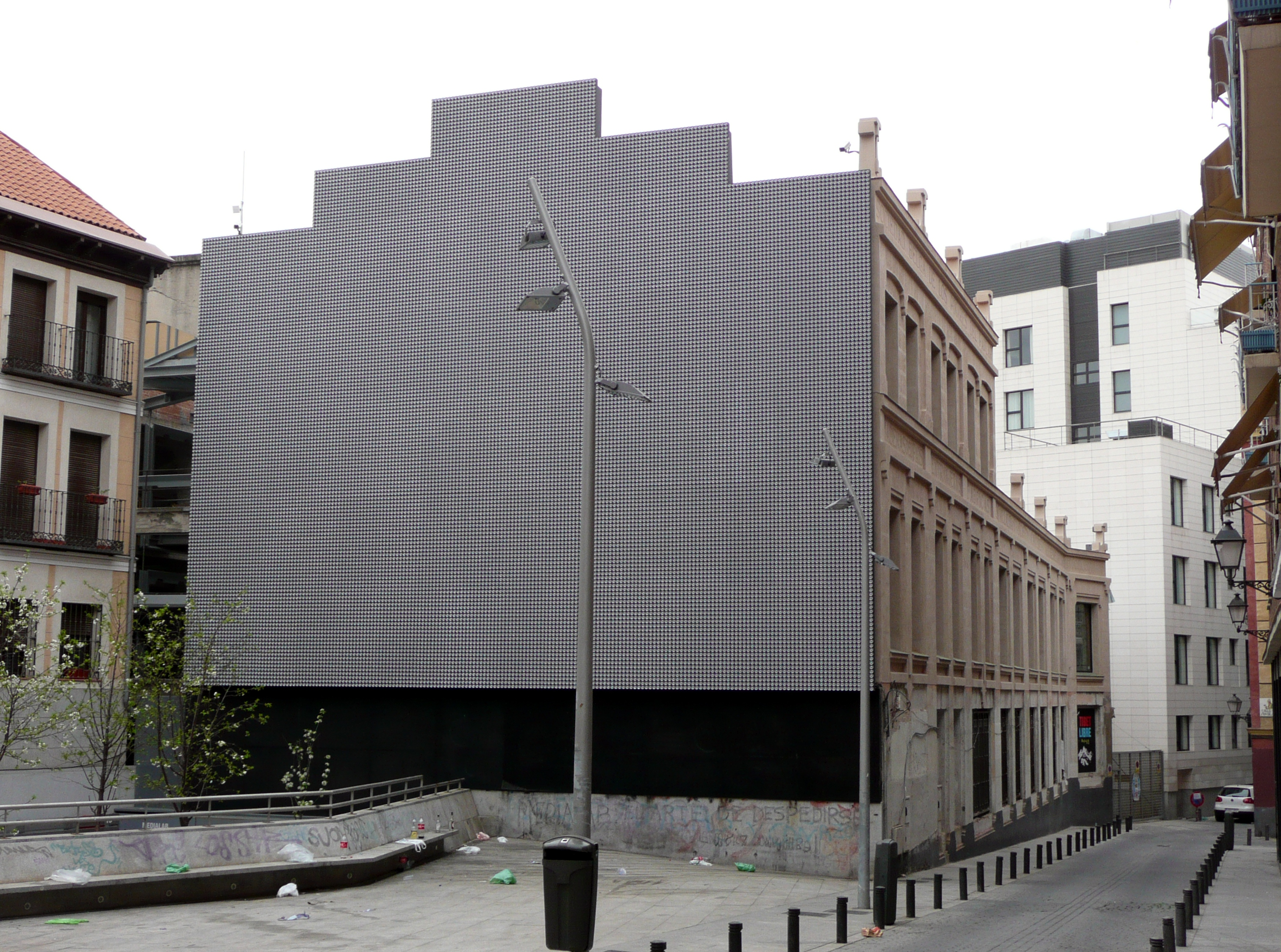
- Medialab-Prado building
- Established: 2000; 26 years ago
- Budget: $2.5 million
- Field of research: Citizen science, Free culture, Open source, Participatory design
- Director: Marcos García
- Location: Madrid, Spain
- Website: https://www.medialab-matadero.es

The Medialab Matadero, formerly known as Medialab Prado, is a cultural space and citizen lab in Madrid, Spain. It was created by the Madrid City Council in 2000, growing since then into a leading center for citizen innovation. It follows a participatory approach, using collective intelligence methods (developed in living labs) and fast prototyping tools such as fab labs, to use and co-create digital commons.

== History ==
The Medialab Matadero started in 2000 as a cultural program of the Madrid City Council within the cultural center Conde Duque. In 2002, it was named "Medialab Madrid", a space focused on the research, production and dissemination of cultural works around society, science, art and digital technologies.

In 2007, it was moved to the basements of the old industrial building Serrería Belga (Belgian Sawmill), and renamed "Medialab-Prado" because of its new location next to the Prado Museum and the Paseo del Prado boulevard. This industrial building was originally built in 1920s and owned by Belgian migrants, and it remained in operation until the 2000 when it was sold to the City Council.

In 2010, it received an honorary award from Prix Ars Electronica.

In 2013, after an extensive refurbishment effort of the Serrería building, the center started using the 4000 m^{2} and all the floors of the now renovated building. This refurbishment was awarded multiple awards, including the 12th Spanish Biennial of Architecture and Town Planning award, the COAM 2013 award and the Sacyr innovation award 2014.

In 2014, the City Council considered renting the building to the Telefónica corporation, in order to host innovation hub initiatives such as Wayra. A manifest signed by a list of renowned names (such as Javier de la Cueva or Antonio Lafuente) supporting the center was published, and eventually the building remained for the sole use of MLP.

In 2016, Medialab-Prado was awarded the Princess Margriet Award by the European Cultural Foundation, for "developing critical spaces of social participation and political experimentation through culture".

In 2021, the Medialab was moved again by the Madrid townhall, from its Serrería Belga location to the Matadero Madrid centre and renamed Medialab Matadero.

== Methods ==
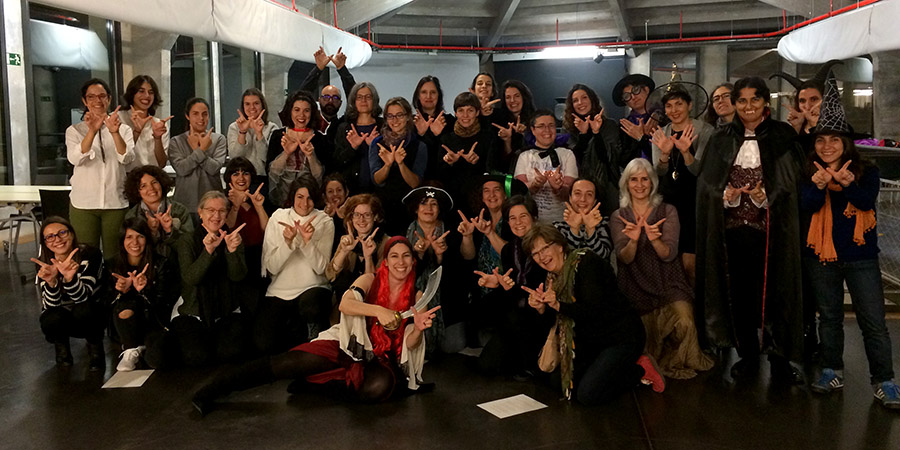
Edit-a-thon "Wiki-witches" to increase women representation in Wikipedia, held in Medialab-Prado

Medialab-Prado stated to follow these methodological principles:

- Community and Mediation: it holds a cultural mediation programme with the aim to interconnect users and projects. In order to facilitate it, users may form work groups that are hosted in the space. It also provides an online platform to facilitate interaction and visibility.
- Prototyping: the center focuses on experimentation, and on implementing the initial phases of new ideas. To facilitate this, it makes regular open calls for participation in collaborative prototyping workshops.
- Free Culture & Commons: it promotes the use of free open source tools, all online content is published under open licenses, and all work groups must open and share their outcomes and processes.
- Networks: Medialab-Prado belongs to collaboration networks at both the local and international level, with the aim to share and exchange practices. Locally, it holds workshops concerning different Madrid neighbourhoods, and collaborates with different public institutions. Internationally, it has collaborated in multiple EU-funded projects and with Latin American institutions through the SEGIB Citizen Innovation programme.

== Activities ==
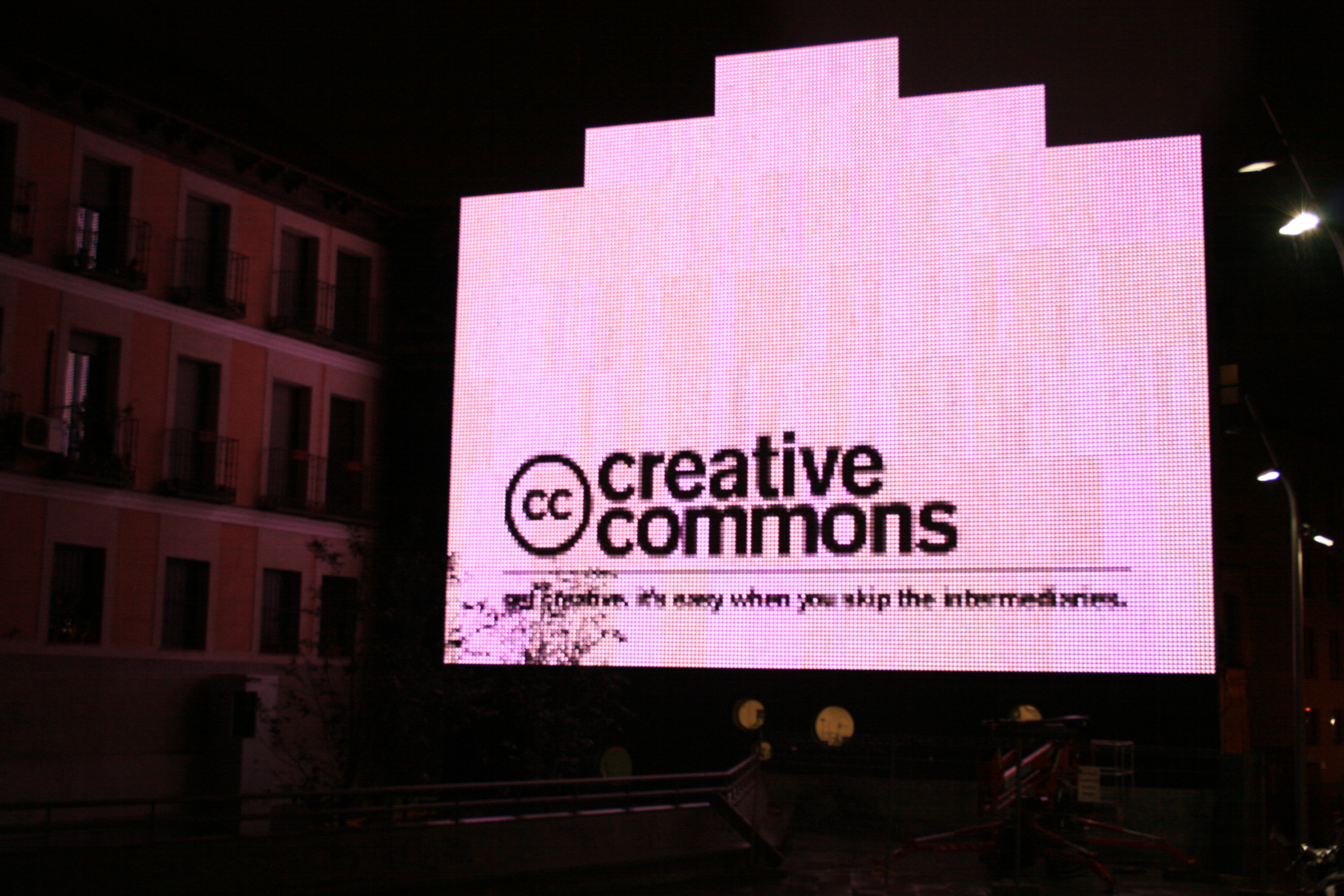
Media Facade of Medialab-Prado

The type of activities are pretty diverse, organized in several lines of work or "labs":

- DataLab, Lab on open data, such as hosting The Glass Room by Tactical Tech and Mozilla, or the data visualization workshops Visualizar.
- ParticipaLab, Lab on collective intelligence for democratic participation, such as the "Collective Intelligence for Democracy" international call.
- InCiLab, Lab of citizen innovation, such as the "Madrid Listens" project, to connect City Hall officials with citizens on specific projects, and other open democracy experiments.
- PrototipaLab, Lab of creative prototyping, such as a collaboration with African cultural mediators, urban art interventions, or artist residencies.
- CiCiLab, Lab of citizen science, including events on scientific outreach.
- AVLab, Lab of audio-video experimentation, such as innovative participatory games, or projecting documentaries on the topic.

In the past, it also hosted a Commons Lab coordinated by Antonio Lafuente although its activities are now included in the other labs.

== International recognition ==
In 2010, it received an honorary award from Prix Ars Electronica. And in 2016, it was awarded the Princess Margriet Award by the European Cultural Foundation, for "developing critical spaces of social participation and political experimentation through culture". It was the first Spanish institution that receives it.

Medialab Matadero has hosted multiple talks of renowned names, including major academics such as Nancy Fraser, Yochai Benkler, or Langdon Winner, or politicians such as EU Commissioner Karmenu Vella. It has also been venue of international events such as Libre Graphics Meeting, the Red Bull Music Academy, the Media Facades Festival Europe, or the Madrid Design Festival.

It was due to one of Medialab Matadero events that the open hardware project Arduino reached international attention. Its Spanish co-founder, David Cuartielles, presented Arduino in the center, where Ars Electronica festival director Gerfried Stoker saw it and invited him to show it at the festival.

Medialab Matadero has been referred by the European Cultural Foundation as "cultural change-makers enacting alternatives in the face of political adversities", and by the UNDP as example of "new spaces [that] are needed for citizens and communities to access [...] digital opportunities". Others claim they "enable the creation of new and highly constructive new communities of concern around difficult topics, as well as building legitimacy for bold experimental approaches", that they are "reinventing mediation patterns" (Phys.org), turning Madrid into "an international reference of the urban commons" (openDemocracy), the most relevant Spanish citizen lab (El Mundo), "emerging institutions at the intersection of art and technology" (TechCrunch).

== See also ==
- MIT Media Lab
- Aalto Media Lab
