= Libre Graphics Meeting =

Annual convention discussing free and open source graphical software

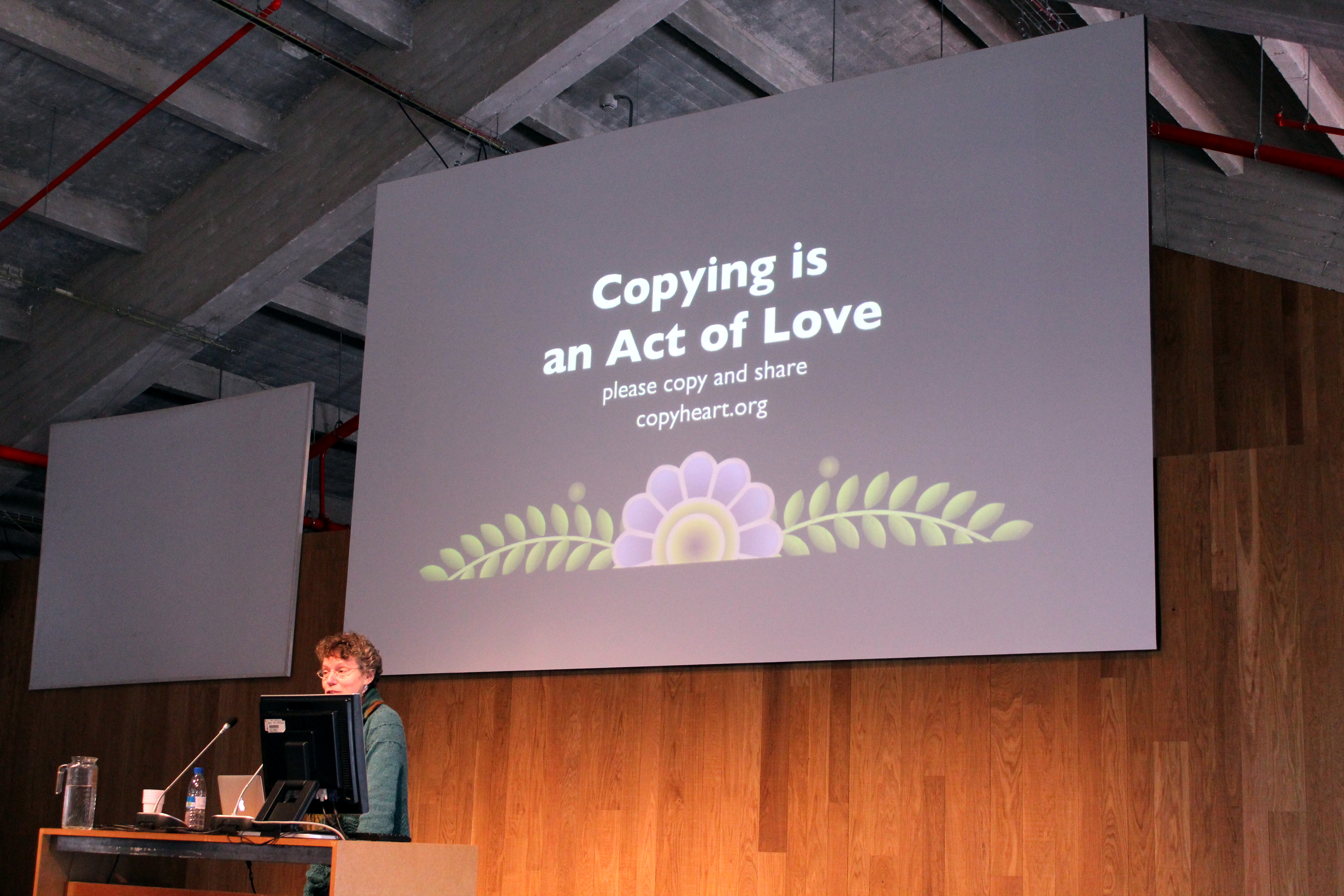
Copying is an act of love, presentation at LGM 2013

The Libre Graphics Meeting (LGM) is an annual international convention for the discussion of free and open source software used with graphics; The first Libre Graphics Meeting was held in March 2006. Communities from Inkscape, GIMP, Krita, Scribus, sK1, Blender, Open Clip Art Library, Open Font Library, and more come together through the Create Project to assemble this annual conference. It was co-founded by Dave Neary and Dave Odin.

== Overview ==
Held yearly since 2006 the Libre Graphics Meeting aims to attract developers, artists and professionals who use and improve free and open source software graphics applications. LGM aims to bring these people together in the cause of creating high quality free graphics applications; By collaborating it allows the development of cross-application assets like brushes and enhanced interoperability such as shared file formats.

Many of the separate groups take the opportunity to hold birds of a feather (BOF) sessions. For many individuals it is the only time they will get to see their team members in person.

== Presentations ==
Many things are discussed at each Libre Graphics Meeting, including usability, standards, announcements, color management and furthering the use of free software graphics applications in professional environments.

Kinematic templates
At the University of Waterloo some original research was done in the field of creating drawing aids for graphics applications. The aim was to allow an artist to draw using templates that would improve the shape or correctness of a brush stroke while maintaining a natural look. This presentation was given by Michael Terry, the lead researcher on the project.

Professional adoption
Ginger Coons gave a presentation at LGM 2009 discussing what it will take to get free software graphics applications in the doors of professional environments and schools

== Collaboration ==
As well as cross pollination of ideas the Libre Graphics Meeting allows the discussion of possible future collaboration.

Louis Suárez-Potts, OpenOffice.org's Community Development Manager and Community Lead was sent to the LGM 2007 to find ways that OpenOffice.org might be able to transcend the boundaries of a traditional office suite by collaborating with other open source projects. One of the ways that has been suggested was that open office could suggest another open source application when it could not perform the role a user required. For example when a user needed to edit an image in an office document, OpenOffice.org may suggest GIMP to fill the role required.

== Locations of Libre Graphics Meetings ==
Libre Graphics Meetings - worldmap
Libre Graphics Meetings - Europe

Year	Dates Held	Location	External Links	Host
2006	March 17 to March 19	Lyon, France	Website	École d'Ingénieurs CPE
2007	May 4 to May 6	Montreal, Canada	Website and Video Recordings	École Polytechnique de Montréal
2008	May 8 to May 11	Wrocław, Poland	Website and Video Recordings	Wrocław University of Technology
2009	May 6 to May 9	Montreal, Canada	Website and Video Recordings	École Polytechnique de Montréal
2010	May 27 to May 30	Brussels, Belgium	Website and Video Recordings	Pianofabriek, Bruxelles
2011	May 10 to May 13	Montreal, Canada	Website and Video Recordings	École Polytechnique de Montréal
2012	May 2 to May 5	Vienna, Austria	Website and Video Recordings	UAS Technikum Wien
2013	April 10 to 13	Madrid, Spain	Website and Video Recordings	MediaLab Prado
2014	April 2 to 5	Leipzig, Germany	Website	Leipzig University
2015	April 30 to May 2	Toronto, Canada	Website	University of Toronto
2016	April 15 to 18	London, UK	Website	University of Westminster
2017	April 20 to 23	Rio de Janeiro, Brazil	Website and Video Recordings	Pontifical Catholic University of Rio de Janeiro
2018	April 26 to 30	Seville, Spain	Website	University of Seville (Faculty of Communication) and Tramallol
2019	May 29 to June 2	Saarbrücken, Germany	Website and Video Recordings	K8 Institut für strategische Ästhetik
2020	May 27 to 29	Online	Website	
2021	May 27 to 30	Rennes, France	Website and Video Recordings	
2024	May 9 to 12	Rennes, France	Website	Activdesign
2025	May 28 to 31	Nuremberg, Germany	Website	Karl-Bröger-Zentrum and Südstadtforum
2026	April 22 to 25	Nuremberg, Germany	Website	Zollhof

== Main achievements ==
- Addition of color management to GIMP and Inkscape.
- OpenRaster initiative to develop an exchange file format for raster graphics, supported by Krita, GEGL and MyPaint.
- Start of the UniConvertor project to provide Corel DRAW and WMF importers for Scribus, Inkscape and any other project willing to use them.
- KDE SC 4 graphics software using LibRaw instead of DCRaw to process Raw files, which is intended to achieve more consistent demosaicing, faster processing using OpenMP and better metadata extraction.
- LensFun library to automatically fix various lens distortions.
- Release of Open Clip Art Library 3.0.
- Release of Open Font Library publicly.
- Release of DeviantArt Developer API.
- Public showing of Milkymist.

== See also ==
- Fontforge
- Open Source Developers' Conference
- Phatch
