= Frogatto & Friends =

2010 video game

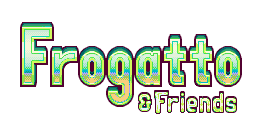
- Developer: David White
- Producer: Guido Bos
- Designers: Guido Bos, David White, Richard Kettering, Ben Anderman
- Artists: Guido Bos, Richard Kettering
- Composer: Ryan Reilly
- Platform: Cross-platform
- Release: July 13, 2010
- Genre: Platform
- Mode: Single-player

Frogatto & Friends is a platform game with adventure elements released in July 2010. The game received positive reviews, particularly for its "gorgeous" pixel art. The game is cross-platform and runs on Linux (including Nokia N900 handheld devices), AmigaOS4, AROS, Mac OS X, Microsoft Windows, iOS and BlackBerry Tablet OS. The game uses an open-source engine (under the zlib license), with game data mostly proprietary and partly under Creative Commons BY license.

== Plot ==
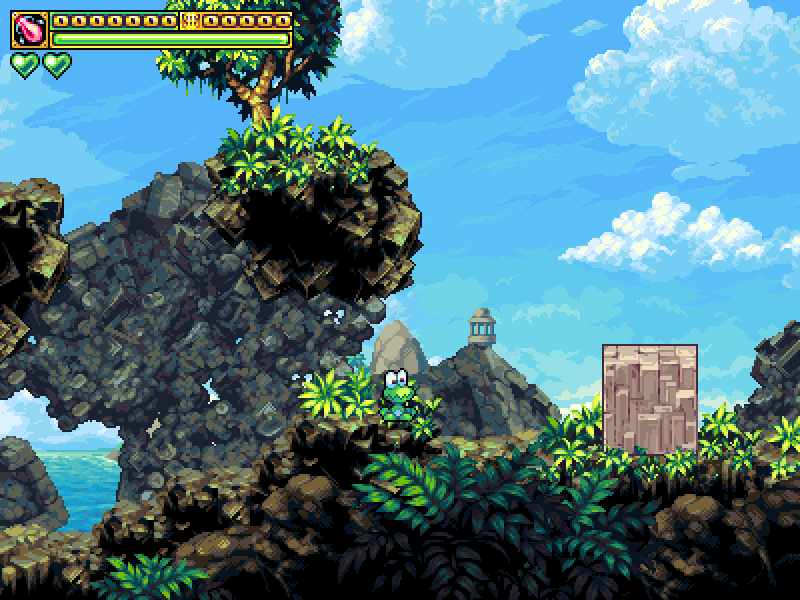
Frogatto's health, score, and money are displayed in the top-left, as well as the selected attack.

Frogatto, a "quixotic" frog, wakes up in his small house on the outskirts of an archipelago-like land. Intending to travel to his nearby town to visit a friend, he finds that the town has been invaded by an army of cats and that the residents have been locked inside of cages and kept under close guard. Traveling to the mayor's house, Frogatto walks in on an army captain intimidating the town's mayor, demanding money. After battling and defeating the captain, the mayor tells him that Milgram, a powerful overlord who controls the majority of land, is attempting to take over the town and is locking down any travel outside of the village. Hoping for a diplomatic and non-violent solution, Frogatto seeks out to find Milgram and speak to him personally, assuring the mayor that this is "a big misunderstanding". After leaving the mayor's house, he finds that all traces of Milgram's army have fled, and all of the cages have been mysteriously unlocked.

He travels out of town, navigating through caves, forests, and jungles to reach Milgram's castle. Upon arriving and navigating through the castle into the throne room, Frogatto fights Milgram. After defeating him, Milgram accepts Frogatto's offer of diplomacy, and they talk over a cup of tea by a fireplace. Frogatto learns from Milgram that in reality, Milgram had agreed to give money to the town mayor to fund building local improvement projects. Milgram had found out that the mayor is actually pocketing the funds and was not using them for the agreed-upon purpose. As consequence, he sent his army in to seize the money as a result of breach of contract. When Milgram's army was unable to find the money, Milgram ordered them to retreat. Despite his actions appearing malicious, Milgram had no malicious intention, although he does admit that his actions were brash and that his army could have executed the task better. Satisfied and content, Frogatto says that his town will likely re-appoint the mayor as the guard for the east gate, concluding that "it'll give him something harmless to do", while also informing Milgram of where the mayor likely stashed the stolen money.

== Development and release ==
The game was created by a team that includes the creator of The Battle for Wesnoth, and three of Wesnoth's department leads. In contrast to their previous project, The Battle for Wesnoth, the Frogatto team did development as a small centralized team, with the intention of building a solid engine and a game to showcase that engine, before trying to build a community around the game; the intent being to speed up development by reducing bureaucracy, and to enable stronger creative freedom over the work.

The game's engine, Anura, is programmed in C++ with cross-platform capability in mind. In the engine's GitHub license file, the source code is licensed under the zlib license and the included content as CC0. Both the source code and the game have been publicly available since r125 of their source repository, but they did not attempt to build a community around the game until after reaching 1.0. It is intended by the developers that the source code of the game be used to help make other open-source games. The engine is also multi-platform and runs on most systems where the game runs. This helps developers of smaller platforms (such as AmigaOS) by giving them technologies to create high quality, open-source, new modern games on (and for) their system (and reach users of other platforms as well).

Frogatto & Friends was released in July 2010. The game is available for purchase for a variety of computer operating systems (e.g. MacOS' app store), and in the iPhone App Store and BlackBerry App World. In 2013, version 1.3 was made available through the Humble Store.

== Reception ==
The game received positive reviews, particularly for its "gorgeous" pixel art. Metacritic ranks the iOS version of the game 78/100 with six favorable reviews. Brian Luftkin from Gamezebo said "the game uses those classic, 2D graphics that have aged well over the years, unlike the blocky graphics from 3D's salad days."

== See also ==
- List of open source games
