= Inkscape =

Vector graphics editor

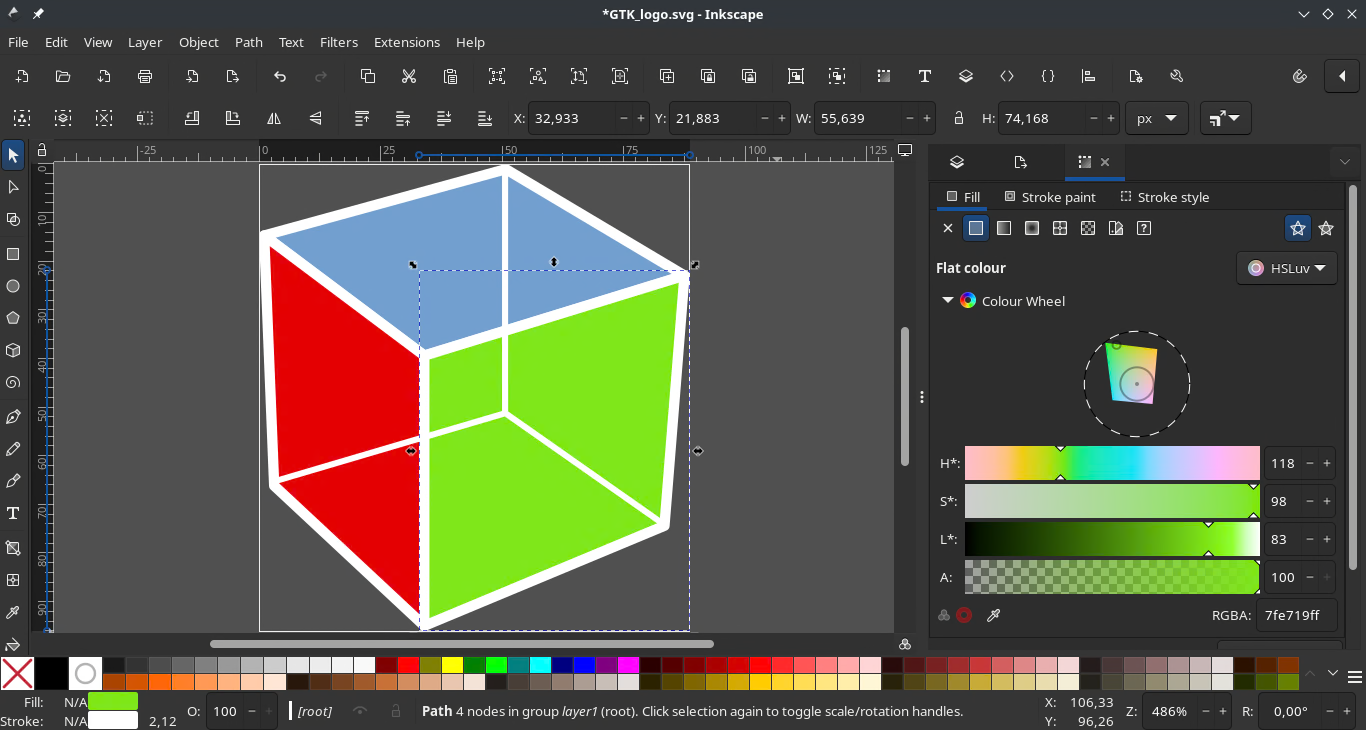
- Inkscape 1.4 on Linux
- Release: November 6, 2003; 22 years ago
- Stable release: 1.4.4 / 6 May 2026; 5 months ago
- Preview release: 1.5 / 26 March 2024; 2 years ago
- Written in: C++ with gtkmm, Python (extensions)
- Operating system: FreeBSD, Linux, macOS, Windows
- Platform: IA-32, x86-64
- Predecessor: Sodipodi
- Available in: 90 languages
- Type: Vector graphics editor
- License: GPL-2.0-or-later
- Website: inkscape.org
- Repository: gitlab.com/inkscape/inkscape

Inkscape is a free and open-source software vector graphics editor released under a GNU General Public License (GPL) 2.0 or later. It is used for both artistic and technical illustrations such as cartoons, clip art, logos, typography, diagrams, and flowcharts. It uses vector graphics to allow for sharp printouts and renderings at unlimited resolution and is not bound to a fixed number of pixels like raster graphics.

Inkscape uses Scalable Vector Graphics (SVGs) as its main file format. It can import and export various file formats, including Adobe Illustrator (AI), Encapsulated PostScript (EPS), PDF, PostScript (PS) and PNG.

Inkscape can render primitive vector shapes (e.g. rectangles, ellipses, polygons, arcs, spirals, stars and 3D boxes) and text. These objects may be filled with solid colors, patterns, and radial or linear color gradients, and their borders may be stroked, both with adjustable transparency. Embedding and optional tracing of raster graphics is also supported, enabling the editor to create vector graphics from photos and other raster sources. Created shapes can be further manipulated with geometric transformations, such as moving, rotating, scaling, and skewing.

== History ==
Inkscape began in 2003 as a code fork of the Sodipodi project. Sodipodi, developed since 1999, was based on Raph Levien's GNOME Illustration Application (Gill).

One of the main priorities of the Inkscape project was interface consistency and usability by following the GNOME Human Interface Guidelines.

Four former Sodipodi developers—‌Ted Gould, Bryce Harrington, Nathan Hurst, and MenTaLguY—‌led the fork, citing differences over project objectives, openness to third-party contributions, and technical disagreements. They said that Inkscape would focus development on implementing the complete SVG standard, whereas Sodipodi development emphasized developing a general-purpose vector graphics editor, possibly at the expense of SVG.

Following the fork, Inkscape's developers changed the programming language from C to C++; adopted the GTK toolkit C++ bindings (gtkmm); redesigned its user interface, and added a number of new features. Inkscape fully implemented SVG 1.1 standard in version 0.91. And it continues with implementation of still unfinished SVG 1.2 and SVG 2.0 standard features like Mesh Gradients. It also supports the Cascading Style Sheets (CSS) standard and extends the format with its own features like node-types and live path effects.

Since 2005, Inkscape has participated in the Google Summer of Code program. Up until the end of November 2007, Inkscape's source code repository was hosted by SourceForge. Thereafter it moved to Launchpad. In June 2017, it moved to GitLab.

== Features ==
=== Object creation ===
Inkscape 0.48.2, showing a rectangle (selected with the select tool), an ellipse, a star and two text objects

Inkscape workflow is based on vector objects. Tools allow manipulating primitive vector shapes: simple ones like rectangles, ellipses, and arcs, and more complex ones like 3D boxes with adjustable perspectives, stars, polygons, and spirals. Rendering feature that can create objects like barcodes, calendars, grids, gears, and roulette curves (using the spirograph tool). These objects may be filled with solid colors, patterns, radial or linear color gradients and their borders may be stroked, both with adjustable transparency. All of those can be further edited by transformations, such as moving, rotating, scaling, and skewing, or by editing paths.

Other tools allow creating Bézier curves, freehand drawing of lines (pencil), or calligraphic (brush-like) strokes which support a graphics tablet.

Inkscape can write and edit text with tools available for changing font, spacing, kerning, rotation, flowing along the path or into a shape. Text can be converted to paths for further editing. The program also has layers (and objects) feature that allows organizing objects in a preferred stacking order in the canvas. Objects can be made visible or invisible, and locked or unlocked, via these features.

Symbol libraries enable Inkscape to use existing symbols like logic-gate symbols or DOT pictograms. More libraries can be added as needed.

Inkscape supports image tracing, the process of extracting vector graphics from raster sources.

Clones are child objects of an original parent object. Different transformations can be applied to them, such as: size, position, rotation, blur, opacity, color, and symmetry. Clones are updated live whenever the parent object changes.

=== Object manipulation ===
Every object in the drawing can be subjected to arbitrary affine transformations: moving, rotating, scaling, skewing, and a configurable matrix. Transformation parameters can be specified numerically. Transformations can snap to angles, grids, guidelines and nodes of other objects, or be aligned in specified direction, spaced equally, scattered at random.

Objects can be grouped. Groups of objects behave similarly to objects. Objects in a group can be edited without having to ungroup them first.

The Z-order determines the order in which objects are drawn on the canvas. Objects with a high Z-order are drawn on top of objects lower in the Z-order. Order of objects can be managed either using layers, or by manually moving the object up and down in the Z-order. Layers can be locked or hidden, preventing modification and accidental selection.

The Create Tiled Clones tool allows symmetrical or grid-like drawings using various plane symmetries.

Appearance of objects can be further changed by using masks and clipping paths, which can be created from arbitrary objects, including groups.

The style attributes are 'attached' to the source object, so after cutting/copying an object onto the clipboard, the style's attributes can be pasted to another object.

Objects can also be moved by manually entering the location coordinates in the top toolbar. Even additions and subtractions can be done this way.

=== File formats ===
Inkscape's primary format is SVG 1.1, meaning that it can create and edit with the abilities and within the constraints of this format. Any other format must either be imported (converted to SVG) or exported (converted from SVG). The SVG format is using the CSS standard internally. Inkscape's implementation of SVG and CSS standards is incomplete. Most notably, it does not support animation natively. Inkscape has multilingual support, particularly for complex scripts. Formats that used the UniConvertor library are not supported beyond the 1.0 release. A workaround is to have a parallel installation of version 0.92.x.

Inkscape file format support
Format name	Import	Export
Adobe Illustrator Artwork (AI)	native	
CorelDRAW (CDR, CDT, CCX, CMX)	native	
Microsoft Visio (VSD, VSDM, VSDX, VDX)	native	
Portable Document Format (PDF)	native	native
compressed SVG (SVGZ)	native	
JPEG	native	with extension
PNG	native	native
GIF	native	
BMP	native	
Computer Graphics Metafile (CGM)	with UniConvertor	
Encapsulated PostScript (EPS)	with Ghostscript	native
PostScript (PS)	with Ghostscript	native
SK1	with UniConvertor	
Affinity Designer (AFDESIGN)	with extension	
Linearity Curve (CURVE, VECTORNATOR)	with extension	
Sketch	with extension	
Scalable Vector Graphics (SVG)	native	native
Xfig (FIG)	with extension	
Flash XML Graphics (FXG)		native
Hewlett-Packard Graphics Language (HPGL)		native
HTML5 canvas element		native
LaTeX (TeX)		native
Synfig (SIF)		native
Extensible Application Markup Language (XAML)		native
WEBP	native	native

=== Other features ===
- XML Editor for direct manipulation of the SVG XML structure
- Support for SVG filter effects
- Editing of Resource Description Framework (RDF), a World Wide Web Consortium (W3C) metadata information model
- Command-line interface, exposes format conversion functions and full-featured GUI scripting
- More than sixty interface languages
- Extensible to new file formats, effects and other features
- Mathematical diagramming, with various uses of LaTeX
- Experimental support for scripting
- Using the Boehm garbage collector
- lib2Geom is now also external usable. 2Geom is a computational geometry library, originally developed for Inkscape. While developed for Inkscape, it is a library that can be used from any application. It provides support for basic geometric algebra, paths, distortions, Boolean operations, plotting implicit functions, non-uniform rational B-spline (NURBS) and more. 2Geom is free software released under LGPL 2.1 or MPL 1.1.
- Creating biological illustrations together with PyMOL.
- Used together with "vinkscape", Inkscape can support version-aware XML documents.

=== Extensions ===
==== Ink/Stitch ====
Ink/Stitch is an addon designed to add stitching tools for machine embroidery into Inkscape. It's available as an installable extension, but also as a custom Inkscape package.

==== Ray Optics ====
Ray Optics is an extension adding optics design and analyzing features to Inkscape.

== Platform support ==
The latest versions of Inkscape are available for Linux, Windows, and macOS platforms. Inkscape is packaged with AppImage, Flatpak, PPA, Snap and source by all major Linux distributions (including Debian, Ubuntu, Fedora, OpenSUSE) with GTK+ 3.24+ (0.92.x with GTK+ 2.20+ for older Linux).

Inkscape can also be installed via FreeBSD ports and pkgsrc, the latter being native to NetBSD, but well-supported on most POSIX platforms, including Linux, Illumos, and macOS.

As of 2017, Wacom tablet support for GTK 3 is in a reviving project. Version 1.0.x includes GTK 3 and Wacom support depending on the necessary Wacom Linux or Unix driver.

=== macOS ===
An issue had affected all GTK3-based apps on macOS Ventura (macOS 13), making the app unresponsive to certain mouse events. GTK is used by many different programs. GTK is a free and open-source cross-platform software widget toolkit for creating graphical user interfaces (GUIs). Inkscape 1.2.2 was also affected and the web site of Inkscape recommended not to install it on Ventura as long as a stable solution was not available. These issues were fixed from version 1.3.

Most of the compatibility issues with Apple silicon processors (M1 and onward) appear to have also been resolved from version 1.3 and the macOS download site for Inkscape offers two options: the Intel version and the arm64 corresponding to the Apple Silicon M family.

== Release history ==
Version	Release date	Notable features, changes
0.35	11 November 2003	Initial release of Inkscape based on Sodipodi 0.32, new keyboard shortcuts
0.36	11 December 2003	GUI redesign and improved usability
0.37	16 February 2004	Boolean path operations and path inset/outset, major code refactoring
0.38	12 April 2004	Text kerning and letter spacing, multi-stage gradients
0.39	20 July 2004	Markers, clones, and pattern fills
0.40	30 November 2004	Multi-layer support, bitmap tracing (only greyscale), and text on path
0.41	10 February 2005	Clone tiler tool and color bitmap tracing
0.42	26 July 2005	Flowing text support, styling text spans, enhanced effects support, and the new gradient tool
0.43	19 November 2005	Connector tool, collaborative editing, tablet pressure/angle sensitivity
0.44	24 June 2006	Layers panel, support for clipping and masking, PDF export with transparency
0.45	5 February 2007	Gaussian blur, pattern along path, new Undo History panel, improved bitmap tracing using simple interactive object extraction, color effects
0.46	24 March 2008	Docking user interface, Paint Bucket, Tweak and 3D Box tools, Live Path Effects, support for most SVG filters, the ability to open PDF files, import from the Open Clip Art Library, and OpenType/PostScript and Type1 font support
0.47	24 November 2009	Eraser tool (can slice paths), timed autosave, spiro splines interface for paths, auto-smooth nodes for paths, spellchecker for the text tool, new path effects like "sketch" and "hatches", new Python extensions like "alphabet soup" and "convert to Braille", basic support for SVG fonts
0.48.x	23 August 2010; July 2014	Multipath node editing, improved text tool: subscript, superscript, numerical and preset inputs for text kerning, tracking and more text enhancements, new Airbrush (Spray) tool, LaTeX export with PDF, PS, EPS, JessyInk extension for creating presentations viewable in SVG-enabled web browsers
0.91	30 January 2015	Switched from libnr to Cairo rendering library, which significantly improved rendering speed. Refactoring; Measure tool, new import/export formats, grayscale mode, alignment modes, Symbol library and support for Visio stencils, Guides can have labels, variable width strokes (PowerStroke).
0.92.x	4 January 2017	Infrastructure Focus; Mesh gradients, new path effects, default resolution changed from 90 dpi to 96 dpi to match the CSS standard, options for switching OpenType font features, last release 0.92.5, windows 7 Minimum for Windows since 0.92.4, 0.92.3 Vista and XP last version
1.0.x	4 May 2020	Transition to GTK3 and Python 3, customizable themes, better HiDPI screen support, controllable width of PowerStroke with pressure sensitive graphics tablet, new PNG export options, variable font support. Native support for MacOS 10.10–10.15 Catalina. Experimental color-managed PDF export, last release 1.0.2
1.1.x	24 May 2021	Significant changes in core and GUI, only Python 3 extensions supported, improved live path effects (LPE), last release 1.1.2
1.2	16 May 2022	New Page tool for multiple pages, Layers and Objects dialog merged, improved gradient editor, ability to export to multiple formats, improved SVG Font Editor, new 'Tiling' Live Path effect, improved performance, bugfix and some changes in GUI, improved macOS integration.
1.2.1	14 July 2022	Critical bugfix
1.2.2	5 December 2022	Maintenance and critical bug fix. Last version to support Windows 7 and 8.
1.3	23 July 2023	New tools for shape building, pattern editor, document resources, page margin and bleed; return of Search, opacity & blend modes in Layers & Objects dialog and of an optional persistent snap bar; improved canvas editing, XML Editor, welcome dialog, LPE, PDF import, public beta available
1.3.1	18 November 2023	Maintenance and bugfix to dedicate to its 20th anniversary
1.3.2	26 November 2023	Fix data loss bugs from previous release, which affect saving stars, polygons, spirals and 3D boxes in SVG
1.4	13 October 2024	Several bug fixes. Filter gallery, modular grids & improved axonometric grids. The Swatches (Palettes) dialog has been improved. Users with CSS knowledge can now customize the styling and basic shape of all the handles. Several improvements were made to the Shape Builder tool. PDF export now supports internal links. DXF files (from Autodesk ) can now be imported into Inkscape
1.4.1	Planned but not released due to significant late‑breaking bug with new features later folded into version 1.4.2	
1.4.2	12 May 2025	Maintenance and bugfix release with some new minor features
1.4.3	26 December 2025	Maintenance and bugfix release with some new minor features.
1.4.4	6 May 2026	Maintenance and bugfix release: 20 crash fixes (including three that prevented launch), more than 25 additional bug fixes, six performance improvements, a new palette, a new button for rotating stars and polygons to an upright position, and installation support for Windows on Arm; also serves as a bridge release capable of converting the planned Inkscape 1.5 multipage SVG format to the pre-1.5 format for compatibility with older versions.
1.5	TBA	Development snapshot available from Inkscape, planned to be released in late October 2026.
Legend: Unsupported Latest version Future version

== Reception ==
In its 2012 Best of Open Source Software Awards, InfoWorld gave Inkscape an award for being one of the best open-source desktop applications, commending its typographic controls and ability to directly edit the XML text of its documents.

PC Magazine's February 2019 review gave the application three out of five stars; criticizing the interface graphics, the lack of optimization for stylus support, the application's poor interoperability with other graphics editors, unwieldy text formatting controls, and the quality of the MacOS version. However, the review did praise the ability to add custom filters, extensions, and the Inkscape community's passion for creating and sharing them. Further, the precision of both the path and placement tools was regarded positively. The review concluded that while Inkscape "boasts outstanding features and a passionate user base for a free program ... it's not suitable for busy professionals."

In January 2020, TechRadar gave Inkscape a positive rating of four stars out of five. It lauded the wide range of editing tools and support for many file formats, but noted that the application's processing can be slow. It considered Inkscape to be a good free alternative to proprietary graphics editors such as Adobe Illustrator. Similarly in July 2023, the Linux weekly newsletter It's FOSS stated Inkscape has become a direct competitor to Adobe Illustrator after the 1.3 version release of Inkscape, which sought to improve efficiency through overhauled user workflows.

== Security ==
Since 2005, security researchers have published several CVEs (Common Vulnerabilities and Exposures) for Inkscape.

== See also ==
- AutoCAD
- Comparison of vector graphics editors
- Create Project
- Krita
- Libre Graphics Meeting
- List of free and open-source software packages
- Openclipart
- Font Library
- Wikipedia tutorial: How to draw a diagram with Inkscape
