= Creative Commons jurisdiction ports =

Creative Commons license localized for a jurisdiction

Licenses ported Licenses currently being ported Licenses ported in the future

Creative Commons (CC), since 2011, has created many "ports", or adaptions, of its licenses to make them compatible with the copyright legislation of various countries worldwide.

However, more recently, CC has been recommending against the use of ported licenses:

As of version 4.0, CC is discouraging ported versions, and has placed a hold on new porting projects following its publication until sometime in 2014. At that point, CC will reevaluate the necessity of porting in the future.

== Work ==
The original, non-localized Creative Commons licenses were written with the US legal system in mind, and the wording of the licenses was sometimes incompatible within the local legislation in countries other than the US, rendering the licenses unenforceable in various jurisdictions. To address this issue, Creative Commons ported the various licenses to bring them into line with local copyright and private law. The porting process involves both translating the licenses into the appropriate languages and legally adapting them to the particular jurisdictions.

As of August 2011, the Creative Commons licenses had been ported to over 50 different jurisdictions worldwide. No new ports have been implemented in version 4.0 of the license, which was released on 25 November 2013. Version 4.0 discourages the use of ported versions, and instead acts as a single global license, which can be used without porting.

== Country teams ==
Creative Commons uses country teams inside particular countries to facilitate consultations and discussion with members of the public and key stakeholders in an effort to adapt the licenses to local circumstances, i.e. their jurisdiction. Such country teams usually have a project lead, and may have their own website in addition to their listing on the main Creative Commons website. Country teams may be supported by other organizations: for example, CC Ireland is a collaboration between Creative Commons and University College Cork.

=== Jurisdictions covered ===
Creative Commons has developed licenses for the following jurisdictions:

- Argentina
- Australia
- Austria
- Belgium
- Brazil
- Bulgaria
- Canada
- Chile
- China
- Colombia
- Costa Rica
- Croatia
- Czech Republic
- Denmark
- Ecuador
- Egypt
- England and Wales
- Estonia
- Finland
- France
- Germany
- Greece
- Guatemala
- Hong Kong
- Hungary
- India
- Israel
- Italy
- Japan
- Luxembourg
- Malaysia
- Malta
- Mexico
- Netherlands
- New Zealand
- North Macedonia
- Norway
- Peru
- Philippines
- Poland
- Portugal
- Puerto Rico
- Romania
- Scotland
- Serbia
- Singapore
- Slovenia
- South Africa
- South Korea
- Spain
- Sweden
- Switzerland
- Taiwan
- Thailand
- United States
- Vietnam

=== Jurisdictions for which licenses are in development ===
Licenses for the following jurisdictions are currently being drafted:

- Armenia
- Azerbaijan
- Georgia
- Indonesia
- Ireland
- Nigeria
- Ukraine

=== Jurisdictions for which development is planned ===
In the following jurisdictions, Creative Commons is either currently working to establish affiliate teams, or a team is in place but the drafting process has not begun yet:

- Iceland
- Kenya
- Lebanon
- Lithuania
- Macau
- Qatar
- Russia
- Rwanda
- Slovakia
- Syria
- Tanzania
- Uganda
- United Arab Emirates
- Venezuela

== See also ==
- Creative Commons license
- Definition of unported
