= Font Library =

Free/open font hosting web site

FONTLIBRARY
- Former name: Open Font Library
- Company type: Non-profit
- Headquarters: St. Louis
- Owner: Fabricatorz Foundation
- Founders: Jon Phillips, Alexandre Prokoudine
- Key people: Christopher Adams, Ana Isabel Carvalho, Dave Crossland, Bassel Khartabil, Ricardo Lafuente, Jon Phillips, Alexandre Prokoudine, George Williams
- Website: fontlibrary.org
- Commercial: No
- Launched: 2006; 20 years ago
- Current status: Active
- Content license: CC0, SIL Open Font License (OFL)

The FONTLIBRARY (originally called the Open Font Library) is a project devoted to hosting and encouraging the creation of fonts released under free licenses. It is a sister project to Openclipart and hosts over 6000 fonts from over 250 contributors. These are intended to be downloaded, remixed and shared freely.

In May 2024, FONTLIBRARY announced the new tagline "Free Fonts Forever". Also, the project announced challenges with artificial intelligence overwhelming the project and a strategy for how to work with artificial intelligence technology and fonts.

In January 2024, FONTLIBRARY posted news that they have adopted Nostr for communications. Also, the project announced that the codebase is being rewritten due to the core technology Aiki Framework being in disrepair since the execution of its founder, Bassel Khartabil. A new logo is also in the works to mark the change. Also, the project rebranded itself FONTLIBRARY.

== History ==
Originally created as the Open Font Library initiative in 2006 by Jon Phillips and Alexandre Prokoudine, the project relaunched on May 12, 2011 at the Libre Graphics Meeting 2011 in Montreal by Fabricatorz developer Christopher Adams.

The Open Font Library hosted a mailing list through which font developers discussed ways to improve libre fonts.

The site was started with a deployment of ccHost version 4, and in 2008 Dave Crossland made a funding campaign that raised over US$10,000 from Mozilla, Prince XML, River Valley and TUG to transition to ccHost 5 with a new brand to promote web font linking. However, the work done with the funds was not published until 2010 at the 2010 Libre Graphics Meeting in Brussels.

The project's members met annually at the Libre Graphics Meeting. In 2011, work supported by Dave Crossland, Christopher Adams, Fabricatorz and other community members got a major release at the LGM in Montreal. Fabricatorz built the project on the Aiki Framework and managed development via Launchpad.

In April 2012, Fabricatorz released an update to Open Font Library that includes an interactive font catalogue preview feature, HTML and CSS code implementation, and a new design by Manufactura Independente.

== See also ==
- FontForge
- Libre Graphics Meeting
- SIL Open Font License (OFL)
