= Antonio Lafuente =

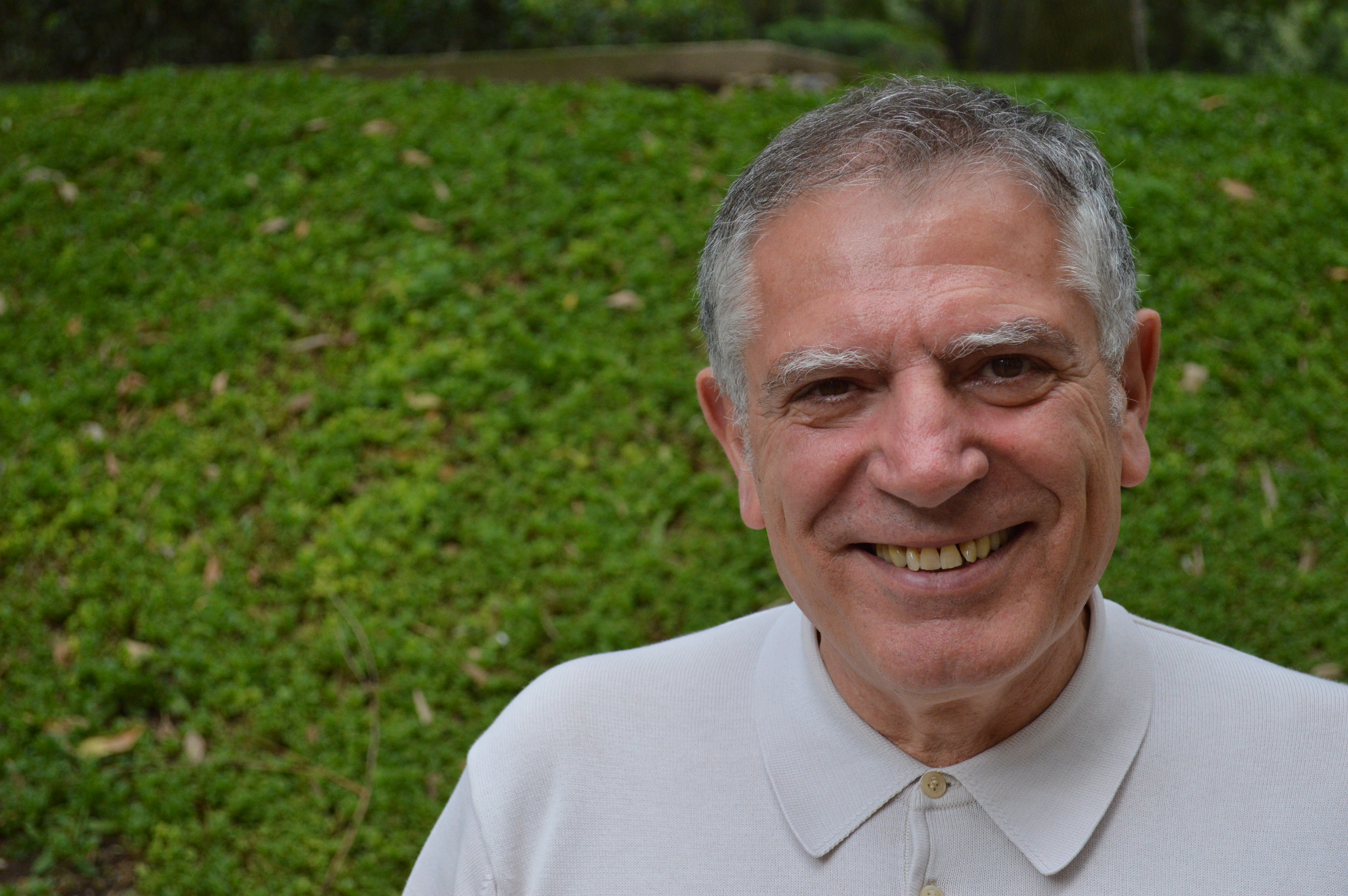
- Born: 1953 (age 71–72); Granada

Antonio Lafuente García (born 1953, Granada) is research scientist at the Center for Humanities and Social Sciences (CSIC) in the area of science studies.

== Life ==
He graduated with a Physics degree.

He has worked in the colonial expansion of science and science's relationship with its public and profane knowledge. More recently investigated the relationship between technology and commons, and the links between new and old estates. The interest in the commons has led him to study the problems of expansion of intellectual property rights in science, as well as the analysis of the implications of the concepts of governance, open knowledge, participation, technical democracy, biz science and scientific culture.

Manager since its inception in 2007, the Laboratory MediaLab-Prado in Madrid, where he shares his theoretical contributions in the study of the commons among which have formalized the theory of the four consistent entornos5 in the body, nature The city and the digital environment. Examples of the commons in each environment we can cite: the body, the DNA; in nature, clean air, outer space, fishing spots, forests and the sea; in the city, the sewage system, the activities born in urban life such as waltz, play football or paint graffiti; in digital, the Internet Protocol Suite, free software, Wikipedia and OpenStreetMap. Lafuente defines the commons as "what is everybody and nobody at the same time. In the old Castilian rather than describing something, it realizes an activity that is done for the benefit of all. The commons, the commons, in any case, is not definable, because it evokes the existence of heterogeneous goods ranging from the old communal pastures new worlds of biodiversity, folklore and gastronomy.

He defends intellectual position opening and democratization of knowledge thereof, but may be within a haven reserved for experts. This openness must be reconsidered or reinvention of politics implementing solutions that prevent or hinder the privatization of issues such as "the photosynthetic function, nutrient cycling or pollination of plants, seeds, seabed and aquifers" must take responsibility for the future transmission of the gifts of nature and culture generations, and the reaffirmation of a commitment to the defense of the common good and new patrimonios.

To Lafuente, techno-scientific creations are an assembly of human and bots. Part of the confidence of the processes of social interaction is increasingly giving way to machines and systems that use coded alert and automated procedures. As an example, the Wikipedia quote Lafuente, where edits by bots pose a high percentage of the total number of edits.
