= The Battle for Wesnoth =

Free and open source turn-based strategy video game

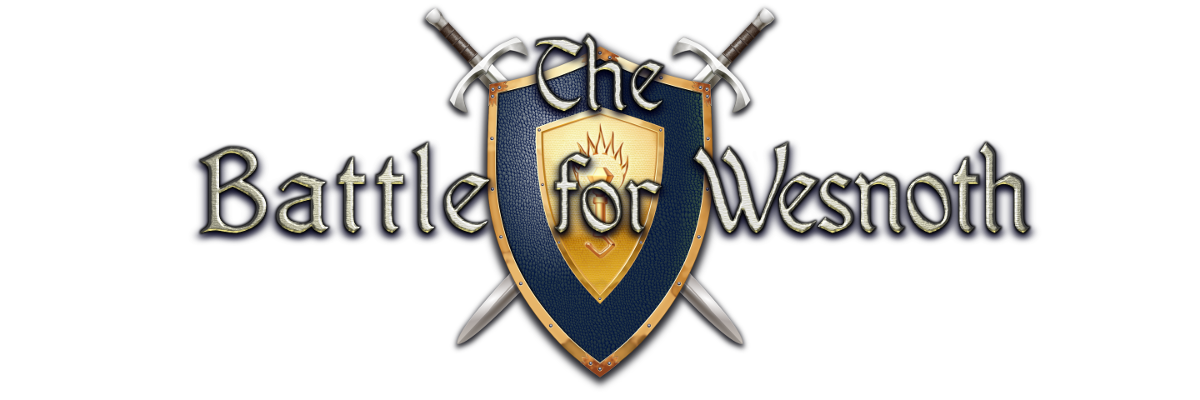

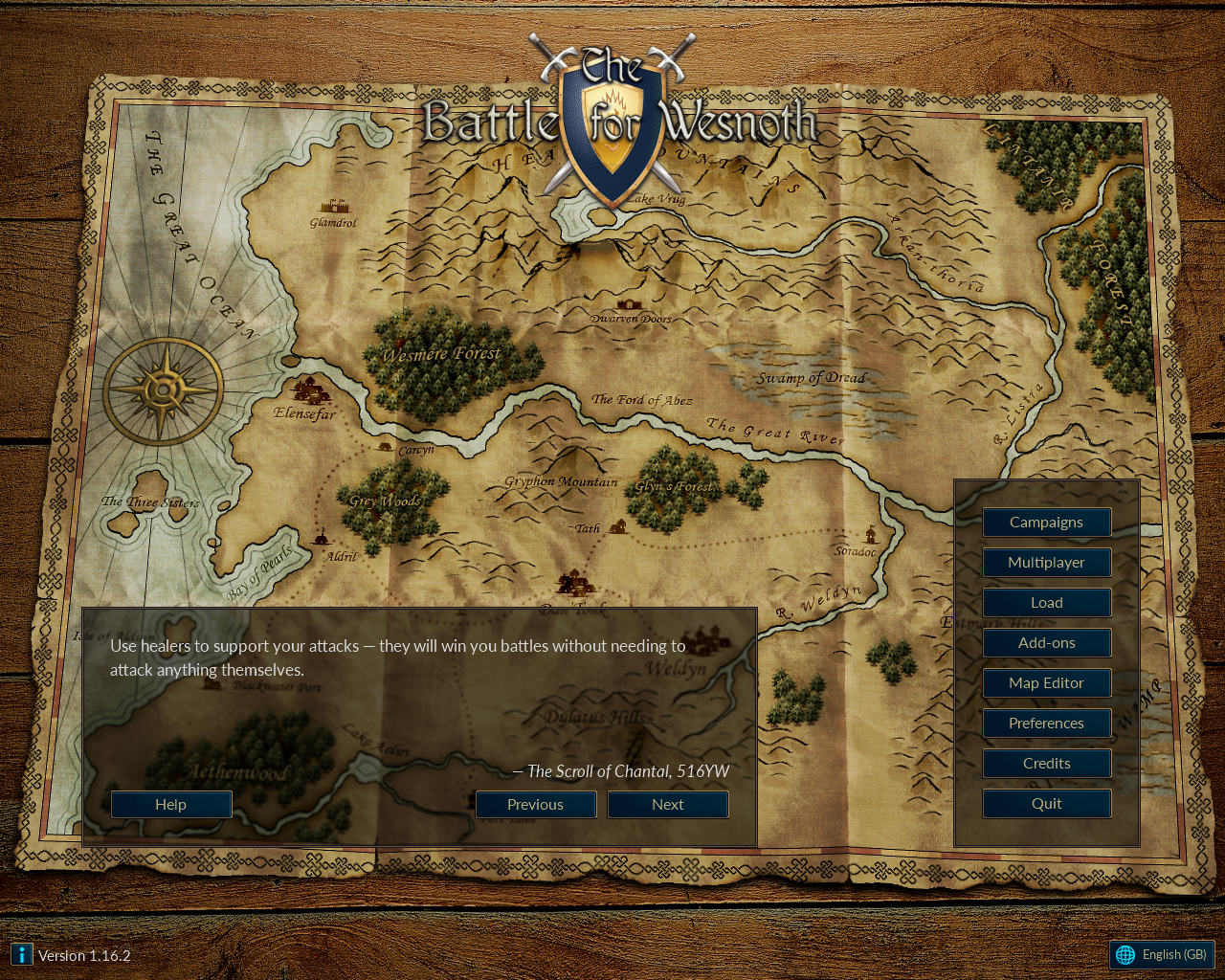
- Title screen from version 1.16.2
- Original authors: David White and others
- Release: 1.0 / October 2, 2005; 20 years ago
- Stable release: 1.18.7
- Preview release: 1.19.23
- Written in: C++, Lua, Python
- Platform: Windows, macOS, Linux, Android, iOS, AmigaOS, MorphOS
- Available in: 55 languages
- Type: Single-player, multiplayer turn-based strategy
- License: GPL-2.0-or-later
- Website: www.wesnoth.org
- Repository: github.com/wesnoth/wesnoth

The Battle for Wesnoth is a free and open-source (Note: Licensed under GNU General Public License version 2 or later) turn-based strategy video game with a high fantasy setting (similar to J. R. R. Tolkien's legendarium), designed by Australian-American (Note: According to his forum data (registration required), he currently lives in Seattle.) developer David White and first released in June 2003. In Wesnoth, the player controls a particular faction/race and attempts to build a powerful army by controlling villages and defeating enemies for experience. The game is loosely based on the Sega Genesis games Master of Monsters and Warsong.

== Gameplay ==
The Battle for Wesnoth is a turn-based wargame played on a hex map. The strategy of battle involves trying to fight on favorable terrain, at a favorable time of day, and, if possible, with units that are strong or well-suited against the enemies. Other concerns are capturing villages that produce a particular trickle rate of gold per turn for unit recruitment, and positioning units to restrict enemy movement. Games of Wesnoth come both in the form of single-player campaigns and multiplayer matches. The goal of these games is usually to defeat all enemy leaders, but there may be other goals.

Each unit in Wesnoth has its own strengths and weaknesses. A unit's defense (which in this case means dodge chance) is based on the terrain it stands on. Elves, for example, are difficult to hit when fighting in a forest. Different types of attacks (melee and ranged), weapon types (pierce, blade, impact, arcane, cold, and fire), and a day-night cycle (in most maps) that alternately favors lawful and chaotic units, alter the amount of damage a unit deals. Units can advance to higher-level counterparts and become more powerful as they participate in combat.

A central design philosophy of the game is the KISS principle; for a new idea to be accepted, it should not complicate gameplay. Another important facet of the game is randomness and its manipulation: it is never certain whether a unit's attack will fail or succeed, only likely or unlikely. Developers have stated that the potential for a skirmish to go better or worse than expected adds excitement, replayability and strategic depth to the game.

== Setting ==
The Main Theme for The Battle for Wesnoth
(Composer: Aleksi Aubry-Carlson)

The Battle for Wesnoth takes place in a world populated by Tolkienesque races such as humans, elves, dwarves, orcs, and trolls, as well as Wesnoth-specific races such as dragon-like Drakes, which are creatures distantly related to dragons, but are bipedal, have an organized, albeit warlike, culture, and are only about 10 feet tall. Campaign stories span the history and geography of the world, but most focus on the eponymous human kingdom of Wesnoth, which suffers frequent invasions of orcish raiders and the undead.

The name Wesnoth was originally developed by the game's creator as a combination of syllables that he thought would sound good as a name for a fantasy land. When the project became larger and more elaborate, the developers created a fictional etymology for the name: the inhabitants of the land of Wesnoth came from the West and North, giving Westnorth, which eventually evolved to Wesnoth. This etymology is explained in the campaign The Rise of Wesnoth.

=== Factions ===
Elf Land
(Composer: Aleksi Aubry-Carlson)
Each race has their own distinctive qualities, including themes. This theme represents the Elvish territories.

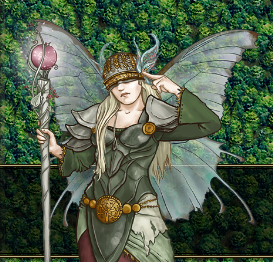
Graphic of a Sylph in Wesnoth

The Battle for Wesnoth currently has six default factions to choose from:

- Rebels

Consist mostly of elvish units, with ent-like woses, mermen, and mages. Most of their level 1 units are capable of both melee and ranged attacks, making the rebels very versatile. Elves ignore the time of day with their neutral alignment and have high defense in forests. They are generally faster, but slightly weaker than other units in most other terrain.

- Knalgan Alliance

These consist of slow but sturdy dwarves with strong melee attacks, allied with human outlaws who fight better under the cover of darkness. Generally, dwarves gain a high defense when occupying mountains and hills. Dwarves are also more adept at traversing caves than any other faction and ignore the time of day. They are vulnerable to attack in open terrain, while their human outlaws fight better in this same terrain.

- Loyalists

These are human cavalry, mages and infantry that ordinarily fight better in the daytime, with mermen allies. They are the most diverse faction, with more units than any other faction except the Knalgan Alliance.

- Northerners

A faction of orcs and goblins, along with troll and naga allies. Their focus is on cheap recruiting, brute force, and close combat, fighting better at night with their chaotic alignment. Most units require little XP (fighting experience) to advance levels. Units often achieve higher mobility when crossing hills.

- Undead

The undead are vulnerable to fire, impact, and arcane attacks, but have high resistance against blade, pierce and especially cold damage. The undead rely on easy access to magic and poison attacks. Some units are able to drain health from enemies in order to replenish their own, and most are immune to poisoning. Unlike other races, most undead units have no traits and no personal names.

- Drakes

A dragon-like race that fights better by day. Most can fly and breathe fire. Their Saurian allies are faster and prefer fighting by night and in swamp areas, though they share the Drakes' vulnerability to cold. Drakes are the most maneuverable faction, though their size makes them prone to attack in most terrain.

- Dunefolk

The dunefolk are the newest faction added to Wesnoth, a faction of humans from southern deserts and hills specialized in attacks at dawn or dusk. The Dunefolk can also recruit naga allies.

The exact units used by the factions, and the faction names, change based on the era or the campaign. The above are the factions of the "Default" era, which is the most played one on the multiplayer servers, and its extension "Age Of Heroes".

There are also a number of user-created factions, several of which are grouped together in downloadable "Eras". For example, the Imperial Era includes the Roman-influenced Lavinians, the Marauders, and the Wild Elves, featuring completely new unit trees and abilities. An alternative era, which contains the Islam-influenced faction Khalifate, was integrated (as of January 2014) in the official development line, Wesnoth 1.11.8, tested to become part of the mainline version. This faction has since been renamed to the Dunefolk in version 1.13.11. It is quite possible to create factions that can be used in the default eras, though the amount of blessing given by the creators for each may vary.

=== Campaigns ===
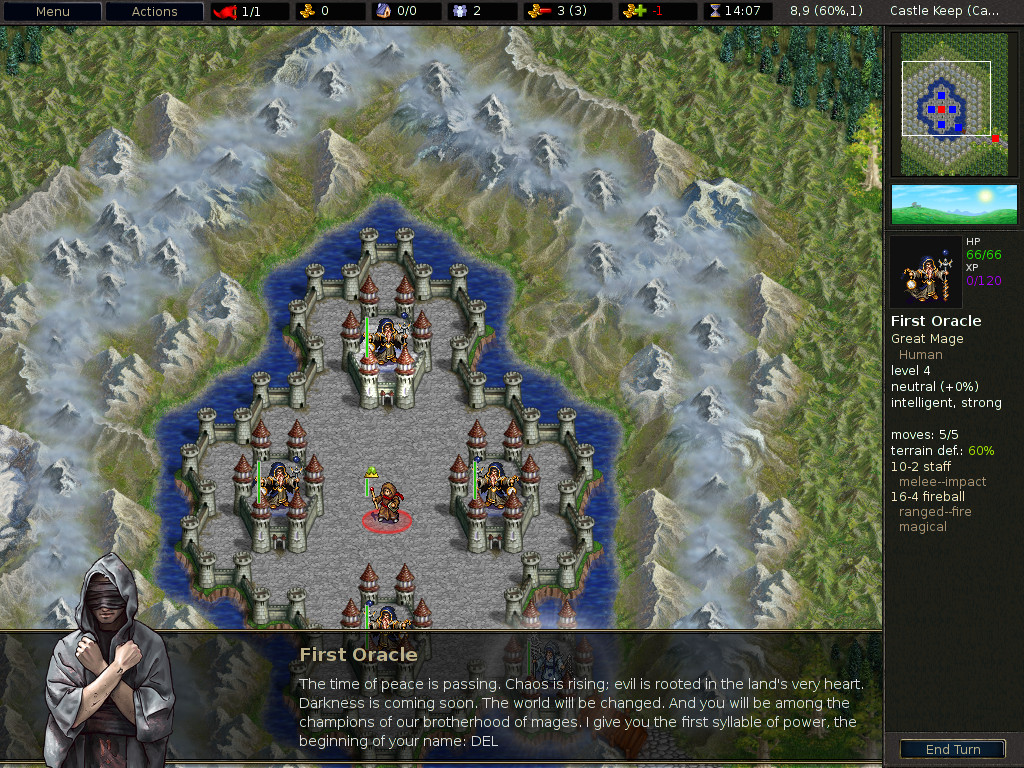
Campaign progression in Wesnoth includes cutscenes such as this, where the story is explained.

The stable version of The Battle for Wesnoth comes with 17 single-player campaigns and a tutorial, each of which has various difficulty levels. More user-authored campaigns can be obtained in the form of add-ons stored on Wesnoth's campaign server, and these are sometimes mainlined as official campaigns. The original campaign for The Battle for Wesnoth was "Heir to the Throne", a campaign with 23 gameplay scenarios where Konrad, a young heir to the throne of Wesnoth, allies with rebellious elves and other races to claim the throne from the usurper queen Asheviere, her loyalist army, and her orcish mercenaries. Characters from "Heir to the Throne" are protagonists in campaigns such as "Legend of Wesmere" and "Delfador's Memoirs". Other campaigns feature different factions, like the dwarves in "The Hammer of Thursagan", "Northern Rebirth" or "Sceptre of Fire", the loyalist army of Wesnoth in "The South Guard" or "Eastern Invasion", and undead in "Descent into Darkness" or "Secrets of the Ancients". Even merfolk can be played in "Dead Water", or orcs in "Son of the Black Eye". Finally, "Under the Burning Suns" is set in the distant future, long after the time of the other campaigns, featuring elves who fight better during the day.

A multiplayer campaign titled "World of Conquest" is added to the game on version 1.16 after previously being an unofficial add-on. A drake campaign named "Winds of Fate" was added to the game in version 1.18.

==== Unofficial campaigns ====
Many official campaigns were only user-made add-ons, for example "An Orcish Incursion", which has been removed from the mainline in 1.15.3. Unofficial campaigns are translated into many languages the same way as the official ones. Some of them are very long and well balanced, like "Invasion from Unknown", while others serve to show units not available in the mainline, or as examples for future campaign makers, like "A simple campaign", "WML Guide" or "The Final Exam". The longest unofficial campaigns have more translatable strings than the longest official campaigns.

== Modding ==
=== Add-ons ===
It is possible to create and distribute additional content (user made content, or UMC), such as campaigns, maps and multiplayer "eras" using an "add-on" system. These add-ons can be downloaded, updated and removed using an in-game add-on server; alternatively, they can be installed and updated by manually downloading the add-on's files and placing them in the appropriate directory, or they can be removed by deleting these files.

=== Editor ===
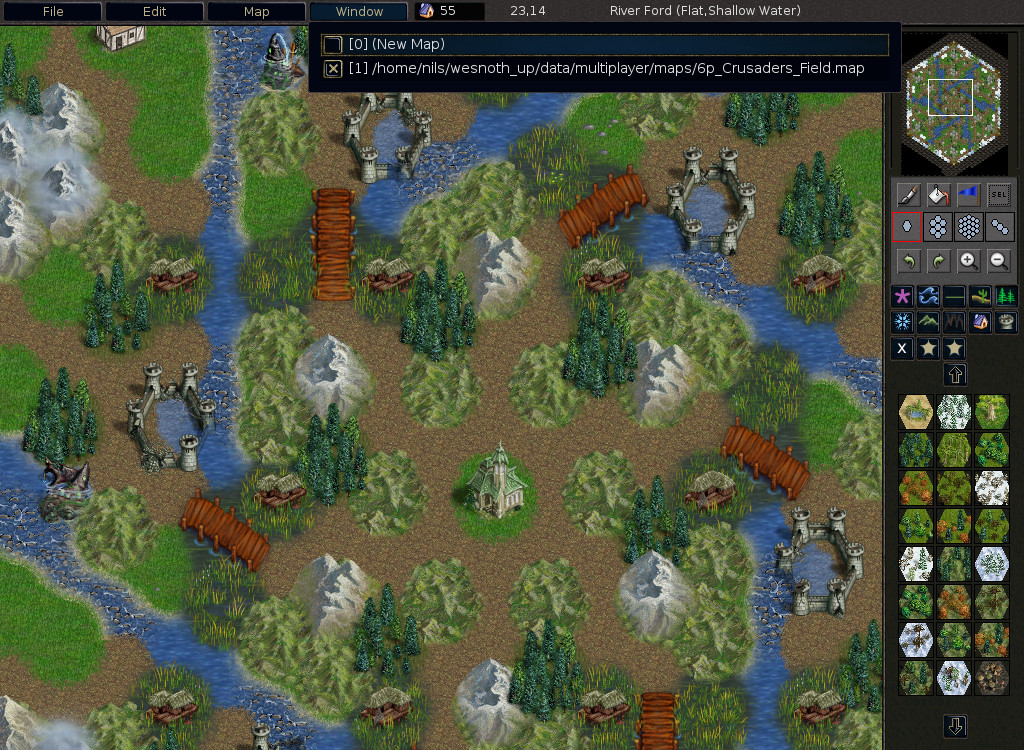
The Battle for Wesnoth's map editor

The Battle for Wesnoth has a built-in map editor, which supports features such as multiple open maps and random map generation. The editor supports all in-game terrains, as well as custom terrains created for campaigns. The time of day can be selected from one of the built-in presets or custom lighting can be created.

=== WML ===
Using any standard text editor, new content can be created using what is known as Wesnoth Markup Language (WML). As its name suggests, WML is similar to XML and other markup languages in syntax with tags defining events and sides in a scenario. WML has evolved from what was a simple markup/configuration language into a specialized programming language designed for easily modifying the game. Examples for the latest stable version are offered on the site's wiki.

=== Lua ===
From the 1.7 development version upwards, code in Lua can be embedded in WML events which gets executed when those events fire. From 1.7.14 on, Lua can also be used to create alternate (or supplemental) AI implementations.

== Development ==
This animated sprite of an attacking fencer unit portrays the general style of Wesnoth sprites.

David White began development of Wesnoth because he wanted to create a freely available, open source strategy game with very simple rules, but one that was challenging and fun, with an artificial intelligence which was difficult to beat — a game that was easy to learn but hard to master.

The game is programmed in C++. It is cross-platform, and runs on AmigaOS 4, BeOS, FreeBSD, Linux (including OS flavors running on GP2X and Nokia n800, n810, and n900 handheld devices), OS X/Darwin, Windows, MorphOS, NetBSD, OpenBSD, RISC OS, iOS, Solaris/illumos, Android, Playbook and Google Native Client running under Google Chrome.

Wesnoth development is decentralized due to its free and open-source nature. The officially blessed campaigns and units bundled with the game download are often derived from content created by the community, somewhat differently from the user-generated content in proprietary games where such content, while available, is usually not incorporated into official builds of the game. The Wesnoth forums and wiki are used to develop new campaigns, including new unit types and story artwork. The game is able to download new campaigns from a central add-on server. Content featured on the official campaign server must be licensed under the GNU GPL-2.0-or-later, like the game itself.

Even when not counting this community content, the list of contributors to the official version of the game as displayed in-game contains over 550 unique entries (May 2010). Developers of the game also include well-known authors from the free software and open source scene, like the co-founder of the Open Source Initiative and core Linux kernel developer Eric S. Raymond, or Linux kernel programmer Rusty Russell.

As of October 2025, The Battle for Wesnoth is available in 55 languages, 11 of which have more than 90% of messages translated.

=== Active developers ===
As of July 2015, The Battle for Wesnoth development team consisted of no more than five developers. On the homepage for the game, it was stated that the reason for a lack of bug fixes was that a few developers worked on each new version of the game and the engine itself, and that the project was understaffed.

In September 2021, project manager Pentarctagon released a statement on the Wesnoth Forums claiming that Wesnoth had a better internal structure than before, yet still called the project "chronically understaffed".

=== Art ===
The art development team was founded by Francisco Muñoz, and directed by Richard Kettering with Hogne Håskjold as the director of terrain art. The current set of portraits were designed primarily by Kathrin Polikeit and Emilien Rotival, replacing the older set of comic-style portraits done by Jason Lutes. Most artwork is stored in the portable network graphics format and all are licensed under the GNU General Public License.

=== Music ===
Still Another Wanderer
(composer: Timothy Pinkham)

Over the Northern Mountains
(composer: Mattias Westlund)
Wesnoth music is based on traditional and medieval styles, albeit produced by synthesizers.

The musical style of the game's soundtrack is orchestral, with a symphony of strings, brass, winds, percussion, and occasionally ethnic instruments when the game allows for it, covering a variety of genre and periods. Because the themes are based on traditional and medieval styles, the music development department rejects all music with synths, loops, drum kits, electric guitars, or any pop/rock instruments. Because Wesnoth has no budget and relies completely on volunteer composers, its soundtrack is entirely synthesized.

The music development team is currently headed by Mattias Westlund and includes some well-known composers like Doug Kaufman and Timothy Pinkham and the game's soundtrack is licensed as free music under the GNU General Public License and rendered in the Ogg Vorbis format. Because the game is constantly evolving, the current list of soundtracks evolves.

Battle for Wesnoth official game music
No.	Title	Music	Length
1.	"Battle-Epic"	Doug Kaufman	1:14
2.	"Battle Music"	Aleksi Aubry-Carlson	5:18
3.	"Breaking the Chains"	Mattias Westlund	3:35
4.	"Casualties of War"	Tyler Johnson	3:32
5.	"Cry from Elensefar"	pluft	4:12
6.	"Defeat"	Timothy Pinkham	0:08
7.	"Defeat"	Ryan Reilly	0:14
8.	"Elf Lands"	Aleksi Aubry-Carlson	0:26
9.	"Elvish Theme"	Doug Kaufman	3:25
10.	"Frantic"	Aleksi Aubry-Carlson	1:24
11.	"Heroes' Rite"	Doug Kaufman	3:39
12.	"Into the Shadows"	Tyler Johnson	3:25
13.	"Journey's End"	Mattias Westlund	3:44
14.	"Knalgan Theme"	Ryan Reilly	9:17
15.	"Knolls of Doldesh"	Timothy Pinkham	6:49
16.	"Legends of the North"	Mattias Westlund	2:43
17.	"Love Theme"	Ryan Reilly	1:35
18.	"Loyalists"	Joseph G. Toscano	2:59
19.	"Main Theme"	Aleksi Aubry-Carlson	0:51
20.	"Over the Northern Mountains"	Mattius Westlund	3:33
21.	"Northerners"	Aleksi Aubry-Carlson	5:02
22.	"Nunc Dimittis"	Jeremy Nicoll	3:50
23.	"Revelation"	Joseph G. Toscano	3:50
24.	"Sad"	Mattius Westlund	1:17
25.	"Siege of Laurelmor"	Doug Kaufman	4:22
26.	"Still Another Wanderer"	Timothy Pinkham	4:22
27.	"Suspense"	Ryan Reilly	5:20
28.	"The City Falls"	Doug Kaufman	4:06
29.	"The Dangerous Symphony"	Gianmarco Leone	5:26
30.	"The Deep Path"	Gianmarco Leone	3:37
31.	"The King is Dead"	Mattias Westlund	2:41
32.	"Transience"	Aleksi Aubry-Carlson	0:48
33.	"Traveling Minstrels"	Mattius Westlund	3:35
34.	"Underground"	Aleksi Aubry-Carlson	1:52
35.	"Vengeful Pursuit"	Jeremy Nicoll	6:00
36.	"Victory"	Timothy Pinkham	0:05
37.	"Victory"	Ryan Reilly	0:21

Included music not officially listed
No.	Title	Music	Length
1.	"Silvan sanctuary"	Mattius Westlund	3:37
2.	"Return to Wesnoth"	Mattius Westlund	3:56
3.	"Weight of revenge"	Doug Kaufman	4:02

Battle for Wesnoth available music (Note: These have not been accepted into the project proper.)
No.	Title	Music	Length
1.	"Theme for Burin the Lost"	NotUncleDave	0:32
2.	"Reminisce"	Jeremy Nicoll	3:45
3.	"War Song"	hiro hito	6:27
4.	"Battle Cry"	Ancestral	4:28

=== Releases ===
The first development release of Wesnoth 0.1 was released on June 18, 2003. In October 2005, the game reached its 1.0 milestone release. On January 29, 2012, version 1.10 was released and introduced the campaign "Dead Water".

In January 2014, a new faction under the name of the Khalifate was added in a development release. It was intended offer new multiplayer options. Khalifate units use no magic, but instead are intended to rely on careful use of terrain and coordinated strikes around dusk or dawn. This faction was released as part of version 1.12 in November of the same year. The Khalifate were renamed to Dunefolk in version 1.13.11.

On May 2, 2018, version 1.14.0 was released. This update introduced the campaign "Secrets of the Ancients". It also made major changes to the desert elves seen in the campaign "Under the Burning Suns". Many units have had changes, such as new portraits and animations. In October 2021 version 1.16 was released. It included many changes to old campaigns such as "The Hammer of Thursagan" as well changes to the Dunefolk faction. In March 2024, version 1.18 was released, adding a new campaign named "Winds of Fate".

Aside of the stand-alone source and binary releases, Wesnoth was previously made available through the Desura digital distribution service. Wesnoth was submitted to Steam Greenlight on July 23, 2016, and was subsequently approved for release by the Steam community. With the release of v1.14.0, the game became then available on Steam in May 2018. At the same time, registration was made mandatory for playing on the official server.

==== Development version ====
Besides the official Wesnoth game version, there is always an alternative development version, that introduces more new features and improvements for players and content creators. This development version is subject to further tweaking and polishing, depending on the Wesnoth community feedback. The current development version is 1.19. Several campaigns are expected to be reworked in this version, such as "The South Guard" and "The Rise of Wesnoth".

== Reception ==
Reviews for The Battle for Wesnoth have generally been positive. In a 2006 review of version 1.1 of the game, Gametunnel rated it a 7/10, adding that "it may seem like a game that belongs in the nineties, but it is engaging and very well put together".

In a 2007 review of version 1.2.6, Phoronix rated it 9/10, calling it "a must-download game for any gamer". In 2008 APCMag.com named The Battle for Wesnoth among the "Top 5 best (free) open source games".

In 2010, Full Circle Magazine reviewed the game in Podcast #4. The reviewers called Wesnoth a "very good game", calling the graphics "simple" and "easy to understand" but "dated". The reviewers called the gameplay "pure and simple", but complained about the role of chance in the game, making it an "exercise in frustration", and requiring a policy of reloading and replaying the game that turns Wesnoth into a "challenge of patience rather than brainpower".

In 2010, RPGFan gave it an 88/100, mentioning that "despite its generous price tag, BfW offers more quality and quantity than almost any commercial title available".

The game was described in-detail in the 2012 book The Architecture of Open Source Applications. According to Rock Paper Shotgun, Wesnoth is considered one of the best free PC games and best strategy games of its kind. Wesnoth was also called one the best open source video games by The Gamer.

Various versions of Wesnoth have been downloaded from the central download site SourceForge over eight million times between 2003 and May 2024. Multiple other freeware download outlets delivered the game additionally hundred thousand times; for instance MacUpdate counted over 80,000 downloads of the macOS version alone, while Softonic counted another 40,000 downloads.

== See also ==
- List of free and open-source software packages
- List of open-source video games
- Frogatto & Friends, another game by some of the developers of Wesnoth
