= Electrobel =

Online community for electronic music artists

- Launch date: March 2003
- Platform(s): Platform independent
- Pricing model: Free
- Availability: Belgium & Luxembourg, France, The Netherlands, United Kingdom & Ireland
- Website: www.electrobel.be

Electrobel is a free online community for electronic music artists that also features free downloads of submitted music.

As stated on the website, "the concept behind the website/community, is that online communities are fun, but aren't practical. Too many people, too much information, ... all this happens when you have the world logging in on a website. Where Electrobel is different from other concepts, is that it is in fact a real world community, but with a website as a meeting point. The website is therefore limited to users residing in the same country. The first portal to open was in Belgium in 2003, since then different portals have opened in different countries."

Electrobel hosts thousands of electronic music songs. All music uploaded and downloaded is released under a Creative Commons license which states that works using the license can be freely uploaded, distributed and used for all non-commercial purposes. Registration is not necessary for downloading, or for posting comments on songs, however it is necessary to register in order to uploading music.

Events are organized regularly where new artists are given the opportunity to play in front of an audience. And since every valid (those living in the country to which the portal is dedicated to) member of the portal has the geographical possibility to be there, they are all potential candidates to playing at the said event(s).

The Electrobel initiative was awarded with a 3rd prize in the Creativity & Culture category at the 2005 World Summit Youth Awards
