= Openclipart =

Free use clip art repository

- Website type: Media repository
- Owner: Fabricatorz Foundation
- Creators: Jon Phillips, Bryce Harrington
- Website: openclipart.org
- Commercial: no
- Registration: Required for posting and uploading
- Users: 193,352
- Launched: 3 May 2004; 22 years ago
- Current status: Active
- Content license: CC Zero 1.0; Unless noted, content is waived of all copyright and related or neighboring rights under this license.

Openclipart, originally founded as Open Clip Art Project, then The Open Clip Art Library, is an online media repository of free-content vector clip art. The project hosts over 182,641 free graphics made by and shared by over 8,185 artists.

== History ==
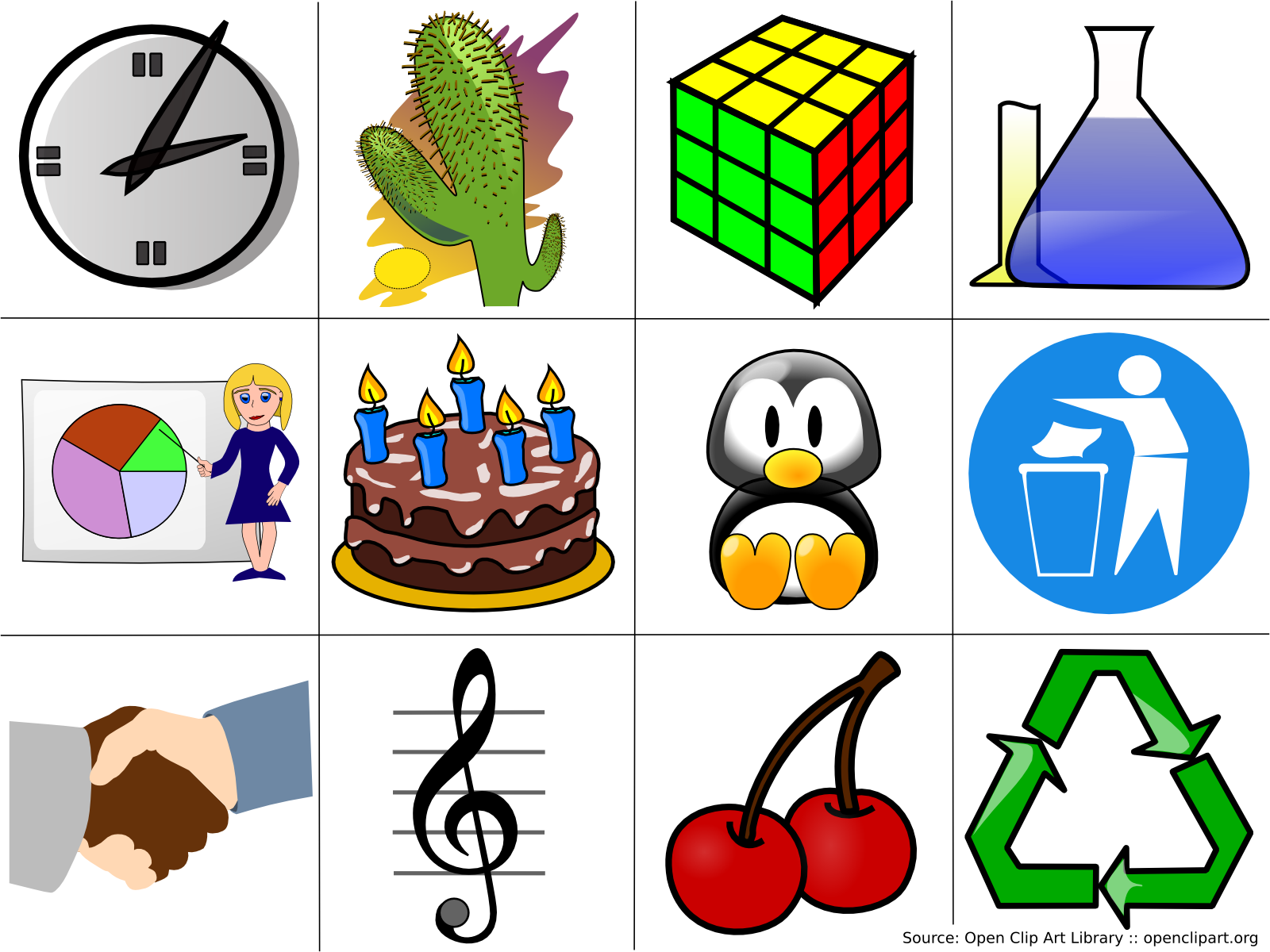
Examples of clip art from Openclipart

The Open Clip Art library (OCAL) was established in early 2004 by Jon Phillips and Bryce Harrington, who had worked together to develop the open-source vector graphics suites Sodipodi and its successor, Inkscape. The OCAL project initially grew out of a project started by Christian Schaller (Uraeus), who, on October 26, 2003, issued a challenge on the Gnome Desktop website for Sodipodi users to create a collection of flags in SVG format. The flag project progressed very well, resulting in a collection of over 90 flags made publicly available in SVG format, and broadened the project's goals to include generic clipart. By December 2003, the size of the clipart in Inkscape's primary repository became an issue and the concept to split the project out into a separate website emerged.

By April 2004, the project became known as Openclipart and was founded on May 3, 2004, with its first community meeting where Openclipart was established with the stated aim of making all its contributed images freely available in the public domain.

In the early stages of the Openclipart project, the website lacked thumbnails and was difficult to browse. Downloadable Openclipart packages were released to help propagate the images in the library, and were available directly from the Openclipart website: as an add-on for various Linux distributions such as Fedora, and as an NSIS installer for Windows. Each package included most of the clipart to date, and they were manually sorted into categories. The Openclipart package version 0.20 was released in 2010. The Openclipart packages received a few more incremental updates during 2010, mostly for seasonal clipart.

On June 23, 2008, developer Bassel Khartabil joined Openclipart with an offer to help the project as a professional developer, and introduced the project to his CMS, Aiki Framework.

In October 2009, Openclipart was included on the cover discs in Linux Format issues 123 and later in June 2010 issue 132 as a package of browseable SVG files from the Openclipart collection.

In March 2009, some Linux distributions, including Mandriva and Ubuntu, included the Openclipart collection releases packaged as SVG, PNG or OpenDocument-format files.

=== Openclipart 2.0 ===
In February 2010, Openclipart converted to use Bassel's Aiki Framework and was announced as Openclipart 2.0 and released in March 2010. The site introduced a change from the old ccHost software to the new AGPL-based Aiki Framework, a content management system modified for Openclipart. The new site allowed anyone to easily browse and add to the Openclipart collection. Jon Phillips, Andy Fitzsimon, Bassel Safadi and Brad Phillips added image thumbnails and improved search functions which made Openclipart more user-friendly. The site received over 5,000 unique visitors and 50,000 page views daily.

=== Openclipart rebrand ===
On April 15, 2013, Openclipart launched a new logo and updated their website design with a "scissors" logo.

On March 12, 2014, Openclipart announced that Inkpad, an open-source drawing app for iPads, had released library integration to make the entire collection available to its users.

=== Lockdown and DDoS attack ===
On April 19, 2019, the site was taken offline by what was initially reported as a distributed denial-of-service attack, though Jon Phillips, one of the site's founders, appeared to be a victim of identity theft.

On May 3, 2019, a plan for bringing the site back online was announced to roll out common features with a new codebase.

=== Openclipart hosted by Fabricatorz Foundation ===
On December 25, 2019, a statement was released that the site was being "gifted to the community" to be hosted with Fabricatorz Foundation and that new files could once again be uploaded to the library. In May 2020, the site's search feature was restored.

=== 2024 ===
In August 2024, Openclipart announced performance improvements to the site.

In September 2024, Openclipart added PDF support and librarian tools to support editing of the collection.

=== 2025 ===
In September 2025, Openclipart released emails about the late Bassel Khartabil and how he entered the project before the Arab Spring. These emails likely are the first public record of Bassel Khartabil as well. Later that month, Openclipart announced official statistics that Openclipart has 193,352 clipart and intends to talk to every past user to get feedback about the future of the project. Openclipart further detailed that the project had added a new Openclipart Membership Program and added features to make sharing Openclipart even easier.

In November 2025, Openclipart made an update with the addition of a new "Upload Remix" feature and a new way to discover clipart, the "Random Search Button".

== See also ==
- Bassel Khartabil
- Creative Commons
- Font Library
- Inkscape
