= CcHost =

Web-based media hosting engine

ccHost is a web-based media hosting engine upon which Creative Commons' ccMixter remix web community is built. The software is written in PHP and uses the MySQL database server. In 2005 it won Linux World's award for Best Open Source solution.

Nathan Willis wrote:

At ccMixter, musicians and DJs are using Creative Commons licensing to share music content and build a community of artists, thanks to the open source back-end system ccHost, an infrastructure designed to facilitate storage, tracking, and sharing of multimedia content.
