= Javier de la Cueva =

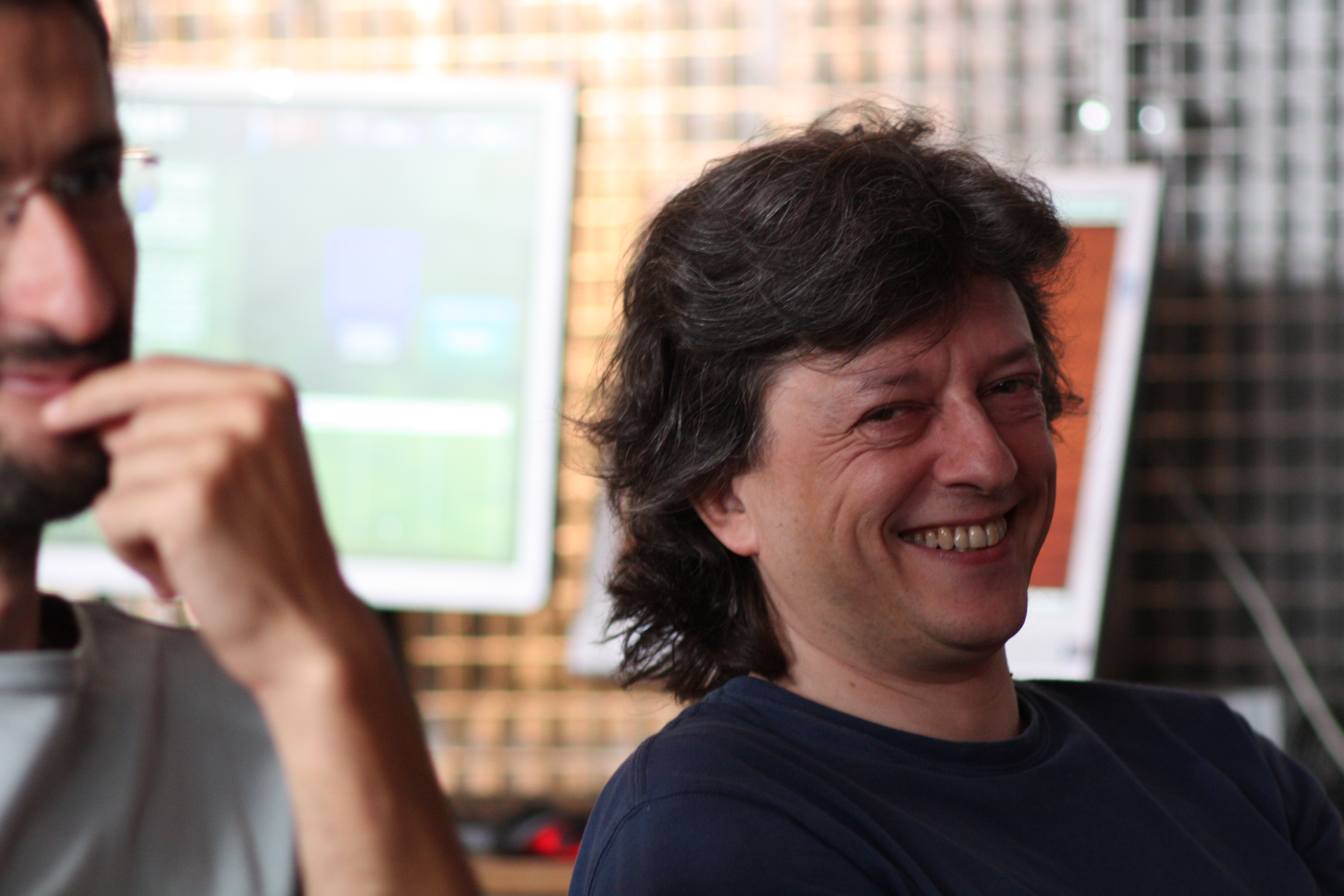
- Born: 1962 (age 63–64); Madrid, Spain
- Occupations: Lawyer, Professor
- Known for: Intellectual property law, Copyleft, Technology law

Javier de la Cueva (born 1962 in Madrid), is a lawyer specialized in technology and the Internet. He graduated in Law and is Doctor in Philosophy from the Complutense University of Madrid. He has defended numerous cases involving the use of free licenses of intellectual property.

== Early years ==
He enrolled at Complutense University of Madrid for a degree in law. Later he earned a doctorate in Philosophy from the same university. He works as a lawyer and professor of subjects related to intellectual property at the University Complutense at the IE School of Human Sciences & Technology.

== Ladinamo ==
For the first time in judicial history this case explored the Copyleft concept. According to de la Cueva, artists wanted to distance themselves from the policy followed by the management companies of Copyright, relying on the use of alternatives to restrictive Copyright licenses. His objective in the short and medium term was to introduce the notion of Copyleft in as many judgments and possible administrative files as possible, extending to the books of jurisprudence analysis.

== Sharemula ==
Sharemula is a website that provided links to P2P networks. This case was jointly defended by de la Cueva and David Bravo Bueno. The hearing confirmed the defense thesis noting that binding to peer networks (P2P) is not a criminal activity.

== E-barcelona.org ==
E-barcelona.org was a discussion platform on cultural policies founded by artist and activist Daniel García Andújar, and was part of a wide network such as e-sevilla, e-valencia, etc. Vegap filed an impeachment against Daniel García Andújar as the ultimate responsible and administrator of e-barcelona.org for disclosure of secrets and copyright in 2008. The judge dismissed the proceedings in May 2015.

== Position before CEDRO ==
Javier de la Cueva refers CEDRO as the SGAE in books world. His fundamental criticism is based on the claim to a private association that appropriates scientific research in universities. This company manages the rights of writers and editors, calls on universities pay a fee for material used in its virtual campus. CEDRO sued the university centers and demanded 5 euro fee for each student. Universities lost lawsuits because the reasoning used for photocopiers applied, regardless of whether a campus was virtual.
