= CcMixter =

Community music produsage website

ccMixter
- Launched: 2004
- Platform: Platform-independent
- Pricing model: Free
- Availability: Worldwide
- Website: ccmixter.org

Madam Snowflake (Emily Richards), CEO of Artistechmedia

ccMixter is a community music produsage website that promotes remix culture and makes samples, remixes, and a cappella tracks licensed under Creative Commons available for download and re-use in creative works. Visitors are able to listen to, sample, mash-up, or interact with music in a variety of ways, including the download and use of tracks and samples in their own remixes. Most sampling or mash-up websites stipulate that users forgo their rights to the new song once it is created. By contrast, the material on ccMixter.org is generally licensed to be used in any arena, not just the ccMixter site or a specific context. The ccMixter site contains over 10,000 samples from a wide range of recording artists, including high-profile musicians such as Beastie Boys and David Byrne.

As a cultural phenomenon, ccMixter represents a direct response to what some say is the increasingly litigious attitude of organizations like the RIAA—one which prevents artists from appropriating elements of others' work for creative reuse in their own.

The site originated as a project of Creative Commons, with the idea being conceived of and developed by Neeru Paharia (then Assistant Director of Creative Commons) as a "Friendster for music" with the intent of exposing the genealogy of remixed music. The vision was both to create a body of openly licensed music, and to motivate artists to share by exposing how their work was being used by other artists in their remixes. Paharia hired Victor Stone (a developer and musician) to build the website, who then became the site's administrator, and project lead. In 2009 Creative Commons licensed the name 'ccMixter' and transferred operations to ArtisTech Media, a company run by members of the ccMixter community. The project maintains close organizational ties to independent minded, open music labels such as Magnatune and BBE. The site runs on ccHost, an award-winning open source multimedia content management system that is able to keep track of how content is being remixed.

In February 2009, Victor Stone, project lead of ccMixter, posted a "memoir" detailing the history and philosophy of the first four years of operations at the site.

== Calls for remixes ==
ccMixter began in 2004 as the host of the Wired CD remix contest. That was followed by several other remix contests where prizes included recording contracts.

In 2007 ccMixter eschewed remix contests, in part, due to concerns in the member community that the site was losing its focus on open music. Instead major artists such as DJ Vadim, Bucky Jonson (The Black Eyed Peas' live backing band) and Trifonic have contributed the solo studio tracks (stems) to entire albums making them available under Creative Commons licenses that allowed remixes. In addition there have been "calls for remixes" by members that post a cappellas, looking to create albums from remixes such Colin Mutchler, Brad Sucks, Tamara Barnett-Herrin (aka Calendar Girl) and Shannon Hurley.

== Transfer of operations ==
In May 2008, Creative Commons posted a Request for Proposals to take over the stewardship and operations of ccMixter. The RFP received broad coverage including Boing Boing, AdAge, and Wired.

On October 28, 2009, the fifth anniversary of the first upload to ccMixter, Creative Commons announced a transfer of operations to ArtisTech Media, a net label owned and operated by members of the ccMixter community.

== Notable artists ==
- Tamara Barnett-Herrin (Calendar Girl)
- Bucky Jonson (the Black Eyed Peas' live backing band)
- DJ Vadim
- Fort Minor
- Kristin Hersh
