= Creative Commons license =

Copyright license for free use of a work

Creative Commons logo

A video explaining how Creative Commons licenses can be used in conjunction with commercial licensing arrangements

A Creative Commons license (CC license) is one of several public copyright licenses produced by Creative Commons (CC), a U.S. non-profit corporation, that enable the free distribution of an otherwise copyrighted "work" for public good. (Note: A "work" is any creative material made by a person. A painting, a graphic, a book, a song and its lyrics, or a photograph of almost anything are all examples of "works".) A CC license is used when an author wants to give other people the right to share, use, and build upon a work that the author has created. CC provides an author flexibility (for example, they might choose to allow only non-commercial uses of a given work) and protects the people who use or redistribute an author's work from concerns of copyright infringement as long as they abide by the conditions that are specified in the license by which the author distributes the work.

There are several types of Creative Commons licenses. Each license differs by several combinations that condition the terms of distribution. Initially released in 2002, there have also been five versions of the suite of licenses, numbered 1.0 through 4.0. Released in November 2013, the 4.0 license suite is the most current. While licenses were originally grounded in the American legal system, Creative Commons created jurisdiction ports to accommodate international laws.

In October 2014, the Open Knowledge Foundation approved the Creative Commons CC BY, CC BY-SA and CC0 licenses as conformant with the "Open Definition" for content and data.

== History ==
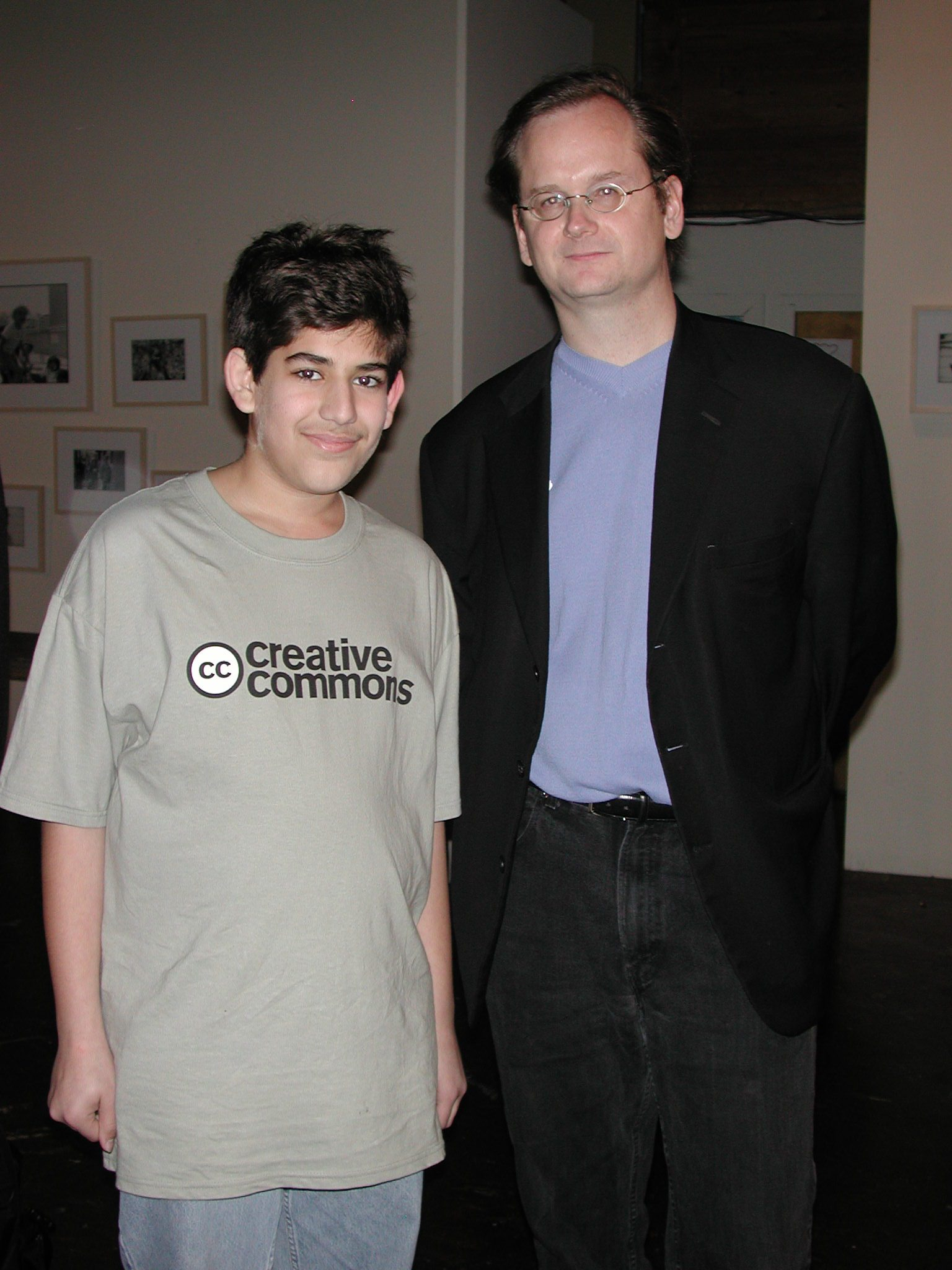
Aaron Swartz and Lawrence Lessig at the 2002 event for the first release of the licenses

Lawrence Lessig and Eric Eldred designed the Creative Commons License (CCL) in 2001 because they saw a need for a license between the existing modes of copyright and public domain status. Version 1.0 of the licenses was officially released on December 16, 2002.

=== Origins ===
The CCL allows inventors to keep the rights to their innovations while also allowing for some external use of the invention. The CCL emerged as a reaction to the decision in Eldred v. Ashcroft, in which the United States Supreme Court ruled constitutional provisions of the Copyright Term Extension Act that extended the copyright term of works to be the last living author's lifespan plus an additional 70 years.

=== License porting ===
The original non-localized Creative Commons licenses were written with the U.S. legal system in mind; therefore, the wording may be incompatible with local legislation in other jurisdictions, rendering the licenses unenforceable there. To address this issue, Creative Commons asked its affiliates to translate the various licenses to reflect local laws in a process called "porting". As of July 2011, Creative Commons licenses have been ported to over 50 jurisdictions worldwide.

== Applicable works ==
Wanna Work Together? animation by Creative Commons

The second version of the Mayer and Bettle promotional animation explaining Creative Commons with Jamendo as an example

Work licensed under a Creative Commons license is governed by applicable copyright law. This allows Creative Commons licenses to be applied to all work falling under copyright, including: books, plays, movies, music, articles, photographs, blogs, and websites.

=== Software ===
While software is also governed by copyright law and CC licenses are applicable, the CC recommends against using it in software specifically due to backward-compatibility limitations with existing commonly used software licenses. Instead, developers may resort to use more software-friendly free and open-source software (FOSS) software licenses. Outside the FOSS licensing use case for software there are several usage examples to utilize CC licenses to specify a "Freeware" license model; examples are The White Chamber, Mari0 or Assault Cube. Despite the status of CC0 as the most free copyright license, the Free Software Foundation does not recommend releasing software into the public domain using the CC0 due to patent concerns.

However, application of a Creative Commons license may not modify the rights allowed by fair use or fair dealing or exert restrictions which violate copyright exceptions. Furthermore, Creative Commons licenses are non-exclusive and non-revocable. Any work or copies of the work obtained under a Creative Commons license may continue to be used under that license.

When works are protected by more than one Creative Commons license, the user may choose any of them.

=== Preconditions ===
The author, or the licensor in case the author did a contractual transfer of rights, needs to have the exclusive rights on the work. If the work has already been published under a public license, it can be uploaded by any third party, once more on another platform, by using a compatible license, and making reference and attribution to the original license (e.g. by referring to the URL of the original license).

=== Consequences ===
The license is non-exclusive, royalty-free, and unrestricted in terms of territory and duration, so it is irrevocable, unless a new license is granted by the author after the work has been significantly modified. Any use of the work that is not covered by other copyright rules triggers the public license. Upon activation of the license, the licensee must adhere to all conditions of the license, otherwise the license agreement is illegitimate, and the licensee would commit a copyright infringement. The author, or the licensor as a proxy, has the legal rights to act upon any copyright infringement. The licensee has a limited period to correct any non-compliance.

== Types of license ==
Creative Commons license spectrum between public domain (top) and all rights reserved (bottom). Left side indicates the use-cases allowed, right side the license components. The dark green area indicates Free Cultural Works compatible licenses, the two green areas compatibility with the Remix culture.

CC license usage in 2014 (top and middle), "Free cultural works" compatible license usage 2010 to 2014 (bottom)

=== Four rights ===
The CC licenses all grant "baseline rights", such as the right to distribute the copyrighted work worldwide for non-commercial purposes and without modification. In addition, different versions of license prescribe different rights, as shown in this table:

Icon	Right	Description
Circled person pictogram	Attribution (BY)	Licensees may copy, distribute, display, perform and make derivative works and remixes based on it only if they give the author or licensor the credits (attribution) in the manner specified by these. Since version 2.0, all Creative Commons licenses require attribution to the creator and include the BY element. The letters BY are not an abbreviation, unlike the other rights.
Circled arrow pointing counterclockwise into itself	ShareAlike (SA)	Licensees may distribute derivative works only under a license identical to ("not more restrictive than") the license that governs the original work (Copyleft). Without ShareAlike, derivative works might be sublicensed with compatible but more restrictive license clauses, e.g. CC BY to CC BY-NC.
Circled dollar sign struck through by diagonal line	NonCommercial (NC)	Licensees may copy, distribute, display, perform the work and make derivative works and remixes based on it only for non-commercial purposes.
Circled equals sign	NoDerivatives (ND)	Licensees may copy, distribute, display and perform only verbatim copies of the work, not derivative works and remixes based on it. Since version 4.0, derivative works are allowed but must not be shared.

The last two clauses are incompatible with free content licenses, according to definitions such as DFSG or the Free Software Foundation's standards, and cannot be used in contexts that require these freedoms, such as Wikipedia. For software, Creative Commons includes three free licenses created by other institutions: the BSD License, the GNU LGPL, and the GNU GPL.

Mixing and matching these conditions produces sixteen possible combinations, of which eleven are valid Creative Commons licenses and five are not. Of the five invalid combinations, four include both the "ND" and "SA" clauses, which are mutually exclusive; and one includes none of the clauses. Of the eleven valid combinations, the five that lack the "BY" clause have been retired because 98% of licensors requested attribution, though they do remain available for reference on the website. This leaves six regularly used licenses plus the CC0 public domain declaration.

=== Six regularly used licenses ===
The six licenses in most frequent use are shown in the following table. Among them, those accepted by the Wikimedia Foundation – the CC BY and CC BY-SA licenses – allow derivative works and commercial use.

CC license comparison
License name	Abbreviation	Icon	Attribution required	Allows remix culture	Allows commercial use	Allows Free Cultural Works	Meets the OKF 'Open Definition'
Attribution	CC BY	CC BY icon	Yes	Yes	Yes	Yes	Yes
Attribution-ShareAlike	CC BY-SA	CC BY-SA icon	Yes	Yes	Yes	Yes	Yes
Attribution-NonCommercial	CC BY-NC	CC BY-NC icon	Yes	Yes	No	No	No
Attribution-NonCommercial-ShareAlike	CC BY-NC-SA	CC BY-NC-SA icon	Yes	Yes	No	No	No
Attribution-NoDerivatives	CC BY-ND	CC BY-ND icon	Yes	No	Yes	No	No
Attribution-NonCommercial-NoDerivatives	CC BY-NC-ND	CC BY-NC-ND icon	Yes	No	No	No	No

=== Zero, public domain ===
Tool name	Abbreviation	Icon	Attribution required	Allows remix culture	Allows commercial use	Allows Free Cultural Works	Meets the OKF 'Open Definition'
"No Rights Reserved"	CC0	CC0 icon	No	Yes	Yes	Yes	Yes

CC zero public domain dedication tool logo

Creative Commons Public Domain Mark. Indicates works which have already fallen into (or were given to) the public domain.

Creative Commons Public Domain Mark (button)

Besides copyright licenses, Creative Commons also offers CC0, a tool for relinquishing copyright and releasing material into the public domain. CC0 is a legal tool for waiving as many rights as legally possible. When that is not legally possible, CC0 falls back to a public-domain-equivalent license. CC0 began development in 2007 and was released in 2009. A major target of the license was the scientific data community.

In 2010, Creative Commons announced its Public Domain Mark (PDM), a symbol used to indicate that a work is free of known copyright restrictions and therefore in the public domain. It is analogous to the copyright symbol, which is commonly used to indicate that a work is copyrighted, often as part of a copyright notice. The Public Domain Mark itself does not release a copyrighted work into the public domain like CC0.

The symbol is encoded in Unicode as U+1F16E 🅮 CIRCLED C WITH OVERLAID BACKSLASH, which was added in Unicode 13.0 in March 2020.

As there is no single definition of public domain and copyright laws differ by jurisdiction, a work can be in the public domain in some countries while still being under copyright in others (so called hybrid status). It is also difficult to assess the legal status of many works. The PDM is recommended to be used only for works that are likely free from any copyright restrictions worldwide. Together, CC0 and the Public Domain Mark replace the Public Domain Dedication and Certification, which took a U.S.-centric approach and co-mingled distinct operations.

In 2011, the Free Software Foundation added CC0 to its free software licenses. However, they recommend against using CC0 to release software into the public domain, as it explicitly withholds patent rights.

In February 2012, CC0 was submitted to Open Source Initiative (OSI) for their approval. However, controversy arose over its clause which excluded from the scope of the license any relevant patents held by the copyright holder. This clause was added for scientific data rather than software, but some members of the OSI believed it could weaken users' defenses against software patents. As a result, Creative Commons withdrew their submission, and the license is not currently approved by the OSI.

From 2013 to 2017, the stock photography website Unsplash used the CC0 license, distributing several million free photos a month. Lawrence Lessig, the founder of Creative Commons, has contributed to the site. Unsplash moved from using the CC0 license to a custom license in June 2017 and to an explicitly nonfree license in February 2018.

In October 2014, the Open Knowledge Foundation approved the Creative Commons CC0 as conformant with the Open Definition and recommended the license to dedicate content to the public domain.

In July 2022, Fedora Linux disallowed software licensed under CC0 due to patent rights explicitly not being waived under the license.

=== Retired licenses ===
Due to either disuse or criticism, a number of previously offered Creative Commons licenses have since been retired, and are no longer recommended for new works. The retired licenses include all licenses lacking the Attribution element other than CC0, as well as the following four licenses:

- Developing Nations License: a license which only applies to developing countries deemed to be "non-high-income economies" by the World Bank. Full copyright restrictions apply to people in other countries.
- Sampling: parts of the work can be used for any purpose other than advertising, but the whole work cannot be copied or modified
- Sampling Plus: parts of the work can be copied and modified for any purpose other than advertising, and the entire work can be copied for noncommercial purposes
- NonCommercial Sampling Plus: the whole work or parts of the work can be copied and modified for non-commercial purposes

== Version 4.0 ==
The latest version 4.0 of the Creative Commons licenses, released on November 25, 2013, are generic licenses that are applicable to most jurisdictions and do not usually require ports. No new ports have been implemented in version 4.0 of the license. Version 4.0 discourages using ported versions and instead acts as a single global license. Additionally, there is a thirty-day grace period to correct the breach of the licensing terms by the licensee and have their rights reinstated. Prior to 4.0 the licensee would lose their rights after breaking the license's terms. This does not impact the ability for licensors to seek remedies. In addition, it allows licensors to request to remove attribution from verbatim work which prior to 4.0 only applied to adaptations.

== Rights and obligations ==
=== Attribution ===
Since 2004, all current licenses other than the CC0 and CC-PD variant require attribution of the original author, as signified by the BY component (as in the preposition "by"). The attribution must be given to "the best of [one's] ability using the information available". Creative Commons suggests the mnemonic "TASL": title – author – source [web link] – [CC] licence.
Generally this implies the following:

- Include any copyright notices (if applicable). If the work itself contains any copyright notices placed there by the copyright holder, those notices must be left intact, or reproduced in a way that is reasonable to the medium in which the work is being re-published.
- Cite the author's name, screen name, or user ID, etc. If the work is being published on the Internet, it is nice to link that name to the person's profile page, if such a page exists.
- Cite the work's title or name (if applicable), if such a thing exists. If the work is being published on the Internet, it is nice to link the name or title directly to the original work.
- Cite the specific CC license the work is under. If the work is being published on the Internet, it is nice if the license citation links to the license on the CC website.
- Mention if the work is a derivative work or adaptation. In addition to the above, one needs to identify that their work is a derivative work, e.g., "This is a Finnish translation of [original work] by [author]." or "Screenplay based on [original work] by [author]."

=== Non-commercial licenses ===
The NonCommercial license allows image creators to restrict selling and profiting from their works by other parties and thus maintaining free of charge access to images.

The "non-commercial" option included in some Creative Commons licenses is controversial in definition, as it is sometimes unclear what can be considered a non-commercial setting, and application, since its restrictions differ from the principles of open content promoted by other permissive licenses. In 2014 Wikimedia Deutschland published a guide to using Creative Commons licenses as wiki pages for translations and as PDF.

=== Adaptability ===
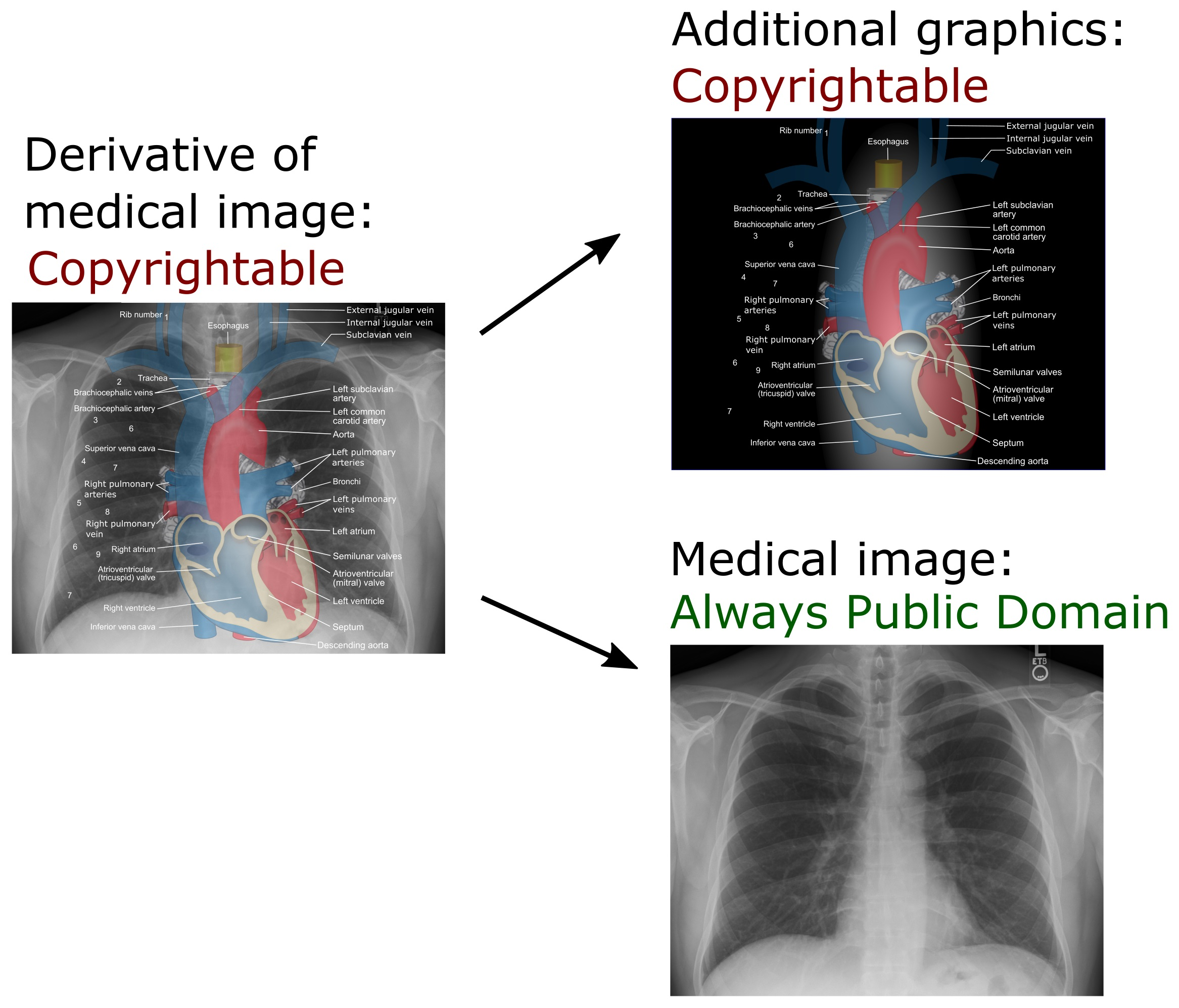
An example of a permitted combination of two works, one being CC BY-SA and the other being public domain

Rights in an adaptation can be expressed by a CC license that is compatible with the status or licensing of the original work or works on which the adaptation is based.

License compatibility chart for combining or mixing two CC licensed works
	Public domain CC0	CC BY	CC BY-SA	CC BY-NC CC BY-NC-SA	CC BY-ND CC BY-NC-ND
Public domain CC0	Yes	Yes	Yes	Yes	No
CC BY	Yes	Yes	Yes	Yes	No
CC BY-SA	Yes	Yes	Yes	No	No
CC BY-NC CC BY-NC-SA	Yes	Yes	No	Yes	No
CC BY-ND CC BY-NC-ND	No	No	No	No	No

== Legal aspects ==
The legal implications of large numbers of works having Creative Commons licensing are difficult to predict, and there is speculation that media creators often lack insight to be able to choose the license which best meets their intent in applying it.

Some works licensed using Creative Commons licenses have been involved in several court cases. Creative Commons itself was not a party to any of these cases; they only involved licensors or licensees of Creative Commons licenses. When the cases went as far as decisions by judges (that is, they were not dismissed for lack of jurisdiction or were not settled privately out of court), they have all validated the legal robustness of Creative Commons public licenses.

=== Dutch tabloid ===
In early 2006, podcaster Adam Curry sued a Dutch tabloid who published photos from Curry's Flickr page without Curry's permission. The photos were licensed under the Creative Commons Non-Commercial license. While the verdict was in favor of Curry, the tabloid avoided having to pay restitution to him as long as they did not repeat the offense. Professor Bernt Hugenholtz, main creator of the Dutch CC license and director of the Institute for Information Law of the University of Amsterdam, commented, "The Dutch Court's decision is especially noteworthy because it confirms that the conditions of a Creative Commons license automatically apply to the content licensed under it, and binds users of such content even without expressly agreeing to, or having knowledge of, the conditions of the license."

=== Virgin Mobile ===
In 2007, Virgin Mobile Australia launched an advertising campaign promoting their cellphone text messaging service using the work of amateur photographers who uploaded their work to Flickr using a Creative Commons-BY (Attribution) license. Users licensing their images this way freed their work for use by any other entity, as long as the original creator was attributed credit, without any other compensation required. Virgin upheld this single restriction by printing a URL leading to the photographer's Flickr page on each of their ads. However, one picture, depicting 15-year-old Alison Chang at a fund-raising carwash for her church, caused some controversy when she sued Virgin Mobile. The photo was taken by Alison's church youth counselor, Justin Ho-Wee Wong, who uploaded the image to Flickr under the Creative Commons license. In 2008, the case (concerning personality rights rather than copyright as such) was thrown out of a Texas court for lack of jurisdiction.

=== SGAE vs Fernández ===
In the fall of 2006, the collecting society Sociedad General de Autores y Editores (SGAE) in Spain sued Ricardo Andrés Utrera Fernández, owner of a disco bar located in Badajoz who played CC-licensed music. SGAE argued that Fernández should pay royalties for public performance of the music between November 2002 and August 2005. The Lower Court rejected the collecting society's claims because the owner of the bar proved that the music he was using was not managed by the society.

In February 2006, the Cultural Association Ladinamo (based in Madrid, and represented by Javier de la Cueva) was granted the use of copyleft music in their public activities. The sentence said:

Admitting the existence of music equipment, a joint evaluation of the evidence practiced, this court is convinced that the defendant prevents communication of works whose management is entrusted to the plaintiff [SGAE], using a repertoire of authors who have not assigned the exploitation of their rights to the SGAE, having at its disposal a database for that purpose and so it is manifested both by the legal representative of the Association and by Manuela Villa Acosta, in charge of the cultural programming of the association, which is compatible with the alternative character of the Association and its integration in the movement called 'copyleft'.

=== GateHouse Media, Inc. v. That's Great News, LLC ===
On June 30, 2010, GateHouse Media filed a lawsuit against That's Great News, LLC. GateHouse Media owns a number of local newspapers, including Rockford Register Star, which is based in Rockford, Illinois. That's Great News makes plaques out of newspaper articles and sells them to the people featured in the articles. GateHouse sued That's Great News for copyright infringement and breach of contract. GateHouse claimed that That's Great News violated the non-commercial and no-derivative works restrictions on GateHouse Creative Commons licensed work when they published the material on their website. The case was settled on August 17, 2010, though the terms of the settlement were not made public.

=== Drauglis v. Kappa Map Group, LLC ===
In 2007, photographer Art Drauglis uploaded several pictures to the photo-sharing website Flickr, giving them the Creative Commons Attribution-ShareAlike 2.0 Generic License (CC BY-SA). One photo, titled "Swain's Lock, Montgomery Co., MD.", was downloaded by Kappa Map Group, a map-making company, and published in 2012 on the front cover of Montgomery Co. Maryland Street Atlas. The text "Photo: Swain's Lock, Montgomery Co., MD Photographer: Carly Lesser & Art Drauglis, Creative Commoms [sic], CC-BY-SA-2.0" was placed on the back cover, but nothing on the front indicated authorship.

The validity of CC BY-SA 2.0 as a license was not in dispute. CC BY-SA 2.0 requires that the licensee use nothing less restrictive than the CC BY-SA 2.0 terms. The atlas was sold commercially and not for free reuse by others. The dispute was whether Drauglis' license terms that would apply to "derivative works" applied to the entire atlas. Drauglis sued the defendants in June 2014 for copyright infringement and license breach, seeking declaratory and injunctive relief, damages, fees, and costs. Drauglis asserted, among other things, that Kappa Map Group "exceeded the scope of the License because defendant did not publish the Atlas under a license with the same or similar terms as those under which the Photograph was originally licensed." The judge dismissed the case on that count, ruling that the atlas was not a derivative work of the photograph in the sense of the license, but rather a collective work. Since the atlas was not a derivative work of the photograph, Kappa Map Group did not need to license the entire atlas under the CC BY-SA 2.0 license. The judge also determined that the work had been properly attributed.

In particular, the judge determined that it was sufficient to credit the author of the photo as prominently as authors of similar authorship (such as the authors of individual maps contained in the book) and that the name "CC-BY-SA-2.0" is sufficiently precise to locate the correct license on the internet and can be considered a valid identifier for the license.

=== Verband zum Schutz geistigen Eigentums im Internet (VGSE) ===
In July 2016, German computer magazine LinuxUser reported that a German blogger, Christoph Langner, used two CC BY-licensed photographs from Berlin photographer Dennis Skley on his private blog Linuxundich. Langner duly mentioned the author and the license and added a link to the original. Langner was later contacted by the Verband zum Schutz geistigen Eigentums im Internet (VGSE) (Association for the Protection of Intellectual Property in the Internet) with a demand for €2300 for failing to provide the full name of the work, the full name of the author, the license text, and a source link, as is required by the fine print in the license. Of this sum, €40 was to go to the photographer, with the remainder retained by VGSE. The Higher Regional Court of Cologne dismissed the claim in May 2019.

== Works with a Creative Commons license ==
Number of Creative Commons licensed works as of 2017, per State of the Commons report

Creative Commons maintains a content directory wiki of organizations and projects using Creative Commons licenses. On its website CC also provides case studies of projects using CC licenses across the world. CC licensed content can also be accessed through a number of content directories and search engines.

== Unicode symbols ==
After being proposed by Creative Commons in 2017, Creative Commons license symbols were added to Unicode with version 13.0 in 2020. The circle with an equal sign (meaning no derivatives) is present in older versions of Unicode, unlike all the other symbols.

Name	Unicode	Decimal	UTF-8	Image	Displayed	Unicode block
Circled equals meaning no derivatives	U+229C	&#8860;	E2 8A 9C		⊜	Mathematical Operators
Circled zero with slash meaning no rights reserved	U+1F10D	&#127245;	F0 9F 84 8D		🄍	Enclosed Alphanumeric Supplement
Circled anticlockwise arrow meaning share alike	U+1F10E	&#127246;	F0 9F 84 8E		🄎	Enclosed Alphanumeric Supplement
Circled dollar sign with overlaid backslash meaning non-commercial	U+1F10F	&#127247;	F0 9F 84 8F		🄏	Enclosed Alphanumeric Supplement
Circled CC meaning Creative Commons license	U+1F16D	&#127341;	F0 9F 85 AD		🅭	Enclosed Alphanumeric Supplement
Circled C with overlaid backslash meaning public domain	U+1F16E	&#127342;	F0 9F 85 AE		🅮	Enclosed Alphanumeric Supplement
Circled human figure meaning attribution, credit	U+1F16F	&#127343;	F0 9F 85 AF		🅯	Enclosed Alphanumeric Supplement

These symbols can be used in succession to indicate a particular Creative Commons license, for example, CC-BY-SA (CC-Attribution-ShareAlike) can be expressed with Unicode symbols CIRCLED CC, CIRCLED HUMAN FIGURE and CIRCLED ANTICLOCKWISE ARROW placed next to each other: 🅭🅯🄎

== Case law database ==
In December 2020, the Creative Commons organization launched an online database covering licensing case law and legal scholarship.

== See also ==
- Closed captioning – uses a similar CC logo
- Free-culture movement
- Free music
- Free software
- Non-commercial educational station
- Independent record label
- Music industry
- Music recording sales certification
- Lists of record labels
- List of largest music deals
