= Serif (disambiguation) =

A serif is a decorative detail on letters and other typographical symbols.

Serif may also refer to:

- Şərif, a municipality in Balakan Rayon, Azerbaijan
- Serif Europe, a software company specialising in creative software
  - Serif DrawPlus, a vector graphics editor
  - Serif PagePlus, a desk-top publishing program
- Seraph, Character featured in "The Matrix Reloaded"
- Şerif, Turkish name
- Serif (publisher), an Independent publishing company based in London
- San Serriffe, a typographical hoax.

== See also ==
- Sans-serif
- Sarif (disambiguation)
