= DrawPlus =

2D vector graphics editor and animation software

- DrawPlus version X4
- Developer: Serif
- Release: 1993; 33 years ago
- Final release: X8 / March 23, 2015; 11 years ago
- Written in: C++ and Python
- Operating system: Microsoft Windows
- Successor: Affinity Designer
- Type: Vector graphics editor
- License: Proprietary
- Website: www.serif.com

DrawPlus was a 2D vector graphics editor and animation software developed by the UK-based software company Serif, also responsible for PhotoPlus, PagePlus, WebPlus, Digital Scrapbook Artist, Affinity Designer, Affinity Photo and other titles.

Serif have ceased development of DrawPlus in order to focus on its successor, Affinity Designer, following its release for Windows.

In addition to traditional vector drawing tools, DrawPlus provides realistic, natural-looking brushes that allow the user to paint with watercolours, oils and other media whilst retaining vector editing capability. DrawPlus is also able to produce Stop frame and Key frame animations, including output to Adobe Flash swf file format and support for ActionScript.

DrawPlus X8 and Starter Edition offer support for pressure-sensitive input devices such as Wacom's range of tablets. Both applications feature a Pressure Studio to allow calibration of the individual devices and allow functions to be mapped to the supported buttons on the tablet. DrawPlus supports pressure-sensitive vector lines and brushes to create a striking range of effects from manga through to painting in an array of media.

DrawPlus is available both as a paid-for version, DrawPlus X8, or as a cut-down Starter Edition which is completely free. Both variants support SVG import and export to provide compatibility with other vector editing software.

== Supported platforms ==
DrawPlus was developed for Microsoft Windows and is fully compatible with Windows XP, Windows Vista (32/64bit), Windows 7 (32/64bit) and Windows 8 (32/64bit).

== History ==
The first standalone version of the program, DrawPlus 2.0, was published in 1994. It coincided with the launch of PagePlus 3.0. New versions of the software were released every 1 to 4 years, with DrawPlus X8 being the final version.

Full list of versions:

- DrawPlus 2.0 1993.
- DrawPlus 3 1996.
- DrawPlus 4 1998.
- DrawPlus 5 2000.
- DrawPlus 6 2001.
- DrawPlus 7 2003.
- DrawPlus 8 2006.
- DrawPlus X2 2007.
- DrawPlus X3 2009.
- DrawPlus X4 2010 introduced PhotoLab in which photos can be edited or enhanced within the program, and Blend Mode capability that gives more control over how objects and layers blend together., as well as improved compatibility and new illustration options.
- DrawPlus X5 2011 introduced a new drawing engine to take advantage of multi-processor computers, end-to-end CMYK workflow and a new drawing mode that works with overlapping objects, amongst other fixes and improvements.
- DrawPlus X6 2013.
- DrawPlus X8 2015.

== Features ==
=== Object creation and editing ===
DrawPlus provides a range of object creation and editing tools which are common in other editors, and also offers additional tools

- Pencil and Paintbrush tools create freehand curves. The Pen tool creates Bézier curves and the Line tool allows easy creation of straight line segments. All of these tools can also be used to manipulate existing curves.
- Arc, Spiral, and Triangle tools create curves
- B-Spline tool creates B-Spline curves
- Context-sensitive Node tool provides control over post-editing objects and nodes.
- A range of QuickShapes which are predefined simple shapes that can be quickly modified with sliders to adjust certain parameters, for example quickly creating rounded rectangles, etc. Shapes include: Rectangles, Ellipses, Stars, Spirals, Cogs, Petals, etc.
- Freeform Paint tool creates solid polygons by 'painting' areas.
- Vector Flood Fill tool fills visible areas
- Eraser tool for intuitive object erasing and manipulation.
- Knife tool to cut through objects leaving them in multiple, editable pieces.
- HSL, RGB and CMYK colour models. Plus a range of Pantone palettes.
- Gradient colour picker which samples gradients and allows them to be used as fills, in addition to single colour picking.
- Gradient fill and transparency effects, also mesh fills.
- Connector and Dimension tools for creating flowcharts and technical drawings.
- Artistic Text, Frame Text (which wraps to a frame) and Curve Text which can be entered onto an existing curve.
- DrawPlus offers image editing and filters through its PhotoLab and also provides a dedicated background-removal tool in the form of Cutout Studio. X4 introduced an Autotrace Studio to automatically convert bitmaps into vector representations.
- Shadow tool to interactively add drop and wall shadows to any object.
- Crop tool allows easy cropping of any object(s) including photographs.
- Blend tool.
- Envelope, Roughen and Perspective tools.
- Filter Effects for one-click realistic effects such as glass, metallic, plastic and other 2D/3D filters. (this is limited in Starter Edition).
- Instant 3D to transform 2D objects into 3D.
- Snapping allows objects to be snapped to page margins, centres and guides. Dynamic Guides allow snapping objects to existing objects and vertices.
- Object Properties tab shows all the current attributes applied to the selected object at a glance and allows them to be edited freely.
- 3D Planes to aid creation of pseudo-3D objects.
- Various Overlays such as Golden Spiral, Rule of Thirds and an Export Overlay, which help with design and layout.
- How To tab offering context-sensitive help depending on current selection and tool choice.
- Layers Control showing previews of each element of the document in a tree-view.
- User-definable keyboard shortcuts.

== Import/export ==
DrawPlus X8 exports EPS, and this version and the free Starter Edition both support the SVG file format in order to allow cross-application document exchange. Both versions also support PNG, JPEG, GIF, Microsoft HD Photo and TIFF export. DrawPlus also opens and exports PDF documents, CAD drawings, and is also able to open EPS documents and Adobe Illustrator files (version 9.0 onwards). DrawPlus can be used to create Adobe Flash swf files and WMV/AVI movies from user animations. DrawPlus can also be used to create GIF animations. Output from both DrawPlus and Starter Edition can be automatically supersampled to create very high quality exported images.

== See also ==
- Comparison of vector graphics editors
- List of vector graphics editors
- Open Clip Art Library
- Open Font Library

== Bibliography ==
- "DrawPlus X5 User Guide" (PDF). Serif. June 30, 2011. Archived from the original on 2019-02-12.
- "DrawPlus X8 User Guide" (PDF). Serif. March 4, 2015. Archived from the original on 2017-12-15.
