= Pixelmator Classic =

Raster graphics editor

- Pixelmator Classic running on OS X Yosemite
- Developer: Pixelmator Team Ltd.
- Initial release: September 25, 2007; 18 years ago
- Operating system: macOS
- Successor: Pixelmator Pro
- Type: Raster graphics editor
- License: Proprietary
- Website: www.pixelmator.com

Pixelmator Classic is a raster graphic editor developed for macOS by Pixelmator Team, and built upon a combination of open-source and macOS technologies. Pixelmator features selection, painting, retouching, navigation, and color correction tools; as well as layers-based image editing, GPU-powered image processing, color management, automation, and a transparent head-up display user interface for work with images. Pixelmator Classic uses Core Image and OpenGL technologies that use the Mac's video card for image processing.

Pixelmator Classic was the first commercial image editor to fully support the WebP image format on Mac.

Pixelmator Classic no longer receives updates and is no longer available on the Mac App Store with the company recommending customers to upgrade to Pixelmator Pro.

== Features ==
- Uses technologies like Core Image and Automator.
- Photoshop images with layers are supported as well as other popular still image file formats.
- Uses layers-based editing.
- Over 40 tools for selecting, cropping, painting, retouching, typing, measuring and navigation.
- Shape tools.
- 16 color correction tools and over 50 filters.
- Integrates with macOS and applications such as Photos and Aperture.
- Pictures can be taken with a FaceTime camera from within the app.
- Quick file conversion can be done with the help of Automator actions.
- macOS ColorSync and ColorSync profiles are supported.
- Support for macOS features such as versions, auto save, and full screen mode.
- Compatibility with macOS Catalina, including support for Sidecar (a dual-screen tool for iPad users) and Apple Pencil as of version 1.5 (released October 10, 2019).
- Editing video adjustments like colors, masks, and effects similar to how photos are edited.

== Limitations ==
Pixelmator Classic does not support image stitching for multi-exposure HDR capture, focus stacking, or panoramic photography.

== Version history ==
Version	Codename	Release date	Significant changes	Notes	Citations
1.0	Firestarter	September 25, 2007	Initial Release	Pixelmator 1.0 was released at a price of $59 (US). A closed beta was earlier released on August 16, 2007.	
1.1	Kitten	December 6, 2007	Over 100 new filters; Third-Party Filter Support; Graphics Tablet Support		
1.2	Draftsman	May 12, 2008	Rulers; Grid; Color Balance; Polygonal Lasso Tool; Curve Tool	Includes some often requested features, like the Curve tool, Polygonal, Lasso Tool, Rulers, Guides and the ability to display an alignment grid.	
1.3	Tempo	November 4, 2008	Magic Eraser; Magic Wand; Improved Paint Bucket; Hue and Saturation; Smart Palette Hide; Action Tooltips; Improved Type Tool	More stability and improvements for working with large images. New features include click-and-drag for adjusting the tolerance of the Magic Wand, Paint bucket and the new Magic Eraser tool on the fly. Renewed the Hue and Saturation, Replace Color and Colorize palettes. Better Stroking capabilities with live preview were added. Besides the previously available English and German languages, it added French and Spanish.	
1.4	Sprinkle	February 23, 2009	New Painting Engine; Major overhaul for brushes; Improved Paint Bucket; Document Presets	This version introduced a new painting engine and the possibility for more advanced brush creation. Support for importing Photoshop brushes is also included. A new cloud generation filter made its way into Pixelmator in 1.4, and a noise filter in 1.4.1.	
1.5	Spider	September 8, 2009	Save for web; Mac OS X Snow Leopard support; Slice Tool	New features include the ability to save for web, send to Mail/iPhoto, trimming, info labels and Italian language support, released less than two weeks prior to this update. Version 1.5.1 brought bug fixes and Brush Collections.	
1.6	Nucleus	July 13, 2010	Major performance improvements; 64-bit support; Layer groups; Mac OS X Snow Leopard or above only	Introduces layer groups and integration with OS X's Image Capture app for importing images from cameras and scanners. Older OS X versions are no longer supported. 1.6.1 (released on September 28), introduces features such as an improved photo browser and a revamped stroke feature. 1.6.2 (released on October 6, 2010), introduces support for the image format WebP.	
2.0	Chameleon	October 27, 2011	UI Changes; Vector Drawing and Shape tools; Content Aware Fill and Healing; Burn and Dodge Tools; Sponge Tool; Red Eye Tool; Pixel Tool; Type Tool Improvements	Improved support for Mac OS X Lion features like Auto Save and Versions.	
2.1	Cherry	August 9, 2012	Retina ready; iCloud support; Effects Browser; New Effects; Alignment Guides; OS X Mountain Lion integration		
2.2	Blueberry	May 8, 2013	Paint Selection Tool; Smart Moving Tool; Convert Text into Shape feature; Shape Style palette; Light Leak effect; Shapes palette	More than 100 new features and improvements.	
3.0	FX	October 22, 2013	OS X Mavericks support; New Layer Styles; Liquify Tools; New Pixelmator Image Editing Engine	Supports the OS X's technologies App Nap and Compressed Memory. Pixelmator is more responsive and power efficient.	
3.1	Marble	January 21, 2014	Optimized for the new Mac Pro; 16-bit color images (exclusive to the new Mac Pro); Option for ordering prints	This version uses the most out of the dual workstation-class GPUs built into the new Mac Pro.	
3.2	Sandstone	May 22, 2014	New Repair tool (Quick, Standard, and Advanced options); 16-bit color images support in all Macs; Layers can now be locked; Convert Selection into Shape	The new Repair tool is also more memory efficient. Other improvements, UI enhancements, and stability and reliability fixes. 3.2.1 makes the switch to the OpenGL Core Profile and resolves some previous bugs.	
3.3	Limestone	November 6, 2014	Supports OS X Yosemite, Extensions, Continuity; iCloud Drive support; Redesigned for Yosemite	Improvements and fixes to stability and reliability. 3.3.1 adds the ability to pinch to zoom in a document window and to scroll through shapes, gradients, and styles within their respective palettes.	
3.4	Twist	October 15, 2015	Supports Split View, Force Touch, and El Capitan; Pixelmator extension for Photos; San Francisco as default font	Bug fixes.	
3.5	Canyon	May 26, 2016	Quick Selection Tool; Magnetic Selection Tool; Pixelmator Retouch Extension for Photos	Tutorial page on website.	
3.6	Cordillera	November 15, 2016	macOS Sierra full compatibility; Update for new Apple MacBook's Touchbar; Tabs improvements; Universal clipboard support; Improvements for P3 Color and Wide Color displays		
3.7	Mount Whitney	October 6, 2017	macOS High Sierra full compatibility; High Efficiency Image File Format (HEIF) support		
3.8	Phoenix	November 30, 2018	macOS Mojave full compatibility; SVG fonts; Continuity Camera Support; Dark Skin Support; Saving as HEIF is now supported		
3.9	Classic	November 13, 2019	macOS Catalina full compatibility; Sidecar and Apple Pencil support		

== See also ==
- Pixelmator
- Pixelmator Pro
- Comparison of raster graphics editors
- Affinity Photo
