= Pixelmator =

Series of graphics editors developed by Apple

- Pixelmator Pro Pixelmator Pro (Creator Studio)
- Original author: Pixelmator Team
- Developer: Apple Inc.
- Release: 25 September 2007
- Stable release: Pixelmator Pro: 4.0 (January 28, 2026; 9 months ago) [±]; Photomator: 3.4.13 (January 28, 2026; 9 months ago) [±]
- Written in: Swift, Objective-C
- Operating system: macOS, iOS, iPadOS
- Type: Graphics software
- License: Proprietary
- Website: www.apple.com/pixelmator-pro/

Pixelmator is a series of graphics editors developed by Apple for macOS, iOS, and iPadOS. Pixelmator apps leverage Apple-specific technologies such as CoreML and Metal. Pixelmator uses a proprietary format across their apps (.PXD), but supports editing a variety of file types including Photoshop, RAW, and WebP.

== History ==
Pixelmator Team was founded in 2007 by Lithuanian brothers Saulius and Aidas Dailidė, and released Pixelmator (now Pixelmator Classic) 1.0 in September of the same year. The company resided in Vilnius, Lithuania. In November 2024, Pixelmator Team agreed to be acquired by Apple for an unknown monetary amount, which was completed on 11 February 2025, the company was later folded into Apple with its products coming under them fully.

== Pixelmator Classic ==
Pixelmator Classic was the original version of Pixelmator released for Mac on 25 September 2007. It uses a palette-style interface with floating toolbars compared to Pixelmator Pro's single-window interface. It is no longer being updated and has been delisted from the Mac App Store.

== Pixelmator iOS ==
Pixelmator for iOS launched on 23 October 2014 as an iPad-exclusive app with touch-optimized versions of Pixelmator's desktop features. In May 2015, Pixelmator for iOS 2.0 was released with support for the iPhone.

Apple no longer updates Pixelmator for iOS as of 13 January 2026, shortly before the release of Pixelmator Pro for iPad.

== Pixelmator Pro ==
Pixelmator Pro is an image, video, and vector editing software for macOS that launched on 29 November 2017. It was a paid upgrade for Pixelmator Classic users, featuring a redesigned interface, a graphics pipeline rewritten using Metal, Apple silicon support and a greater focus on ML/AI editing features.

On 28 January 2026, Apple announced Apple Creator Studio, a subscription bundle for their professional software that contains Pixelmator Pro. They also brought Pixelmator Pro to iPad, shortly after discontinuing Pixelmator iOS.

== Photomator ==
Photomator (formerly Pixelmator Photo) is a photo-oriented editing app which launched on iPad in 2019, on iOS in 2021, and macOS in 2022. After launching the macOS version, the app moved from a one-time purchase to a subscription; however, a lifetime license can still be purchased for $99.

Photomator differentiates itself from other Pixelmator apps with features such as batch editing of full photoshoots and AI-powered color correction. Edits in Photomator are made on a single layer and are non-destructive.

As of October 2026, Photomator has not received a major update since 15 October 2024, with the release of version 3.4. Unlike Pixelmator, Photomator was not included in Apple's Creator Studio, leaving users wondering about the app's future and whether Apple plans to continue developing the platform into a true alternative to Lightroom.

== See also ==
- Adobe Lightroom
- Adobe Photoshop
- Affinity Designer
- Affinity Photo
