= Digital Scrapbook Artist =

Scrapbooking software

- Digital Scrapbook Artist 1.5
- Developer(s): Serif
- Stable release: 2.0 / June 4, 2009
- Written in: C++
- Operating system: Microsoft Windows
- Type: Vector graphics editor
- License: Proprietary
- Website: www.serif.com

Serif Digital Scrapbook Artist is a digital scrapbooking program for Microsoft Windows.

It has many standard vector graphics features, due to a shared code base with DrawPlus and also includes features designed specifically for digital scrapbooking such as photo frames, auto-flowing of photos into frames, asset management (can load backgrounds, layouts and embellishments from pack files), a cut-out studio, photo adjustments and realistic filters effects. It also includes a selection of high resolution photographic assets, and is capable of exporting 300 DPI images for print or upload to photo sharing websites.

== Supported platforms ==
Digital Scrapbook Artist was developed for Microsoft Windows and is fully compatible with Windows XP, Windows Vista (32/64bit) and Windows 7 (32/64bit).

== Features ==
=== Object creation and editing ===
- Pencil and Paintbrush tools create freehand curves. The Pen tool creates Bézier curves and the Line tool allows easy creation of straight line segments. All of these tools can also be used to manipulate existing curves.
- The context-sensitive Node tool provides control over post-editing objects and nodes.
- Digital Scrapbook Artist has a number of QuickShapes which are predefined simple shapes that can be quickly modified with sliders to adjust certain parameters, for example quickly creating rounded rectangles, etc. Shapes include: Rectangles, Ellipses, Stars, Spirals, Cogs, Petals, etc.
- Freeform Paint tool creates solid polygons as the user draws with a 'blob' brush.
- Eraser tool allows objects to be erased or manipulated intuitively.
- Knife tool can be used to simply cut through objects leaving them in multiple, editable pieces.
- Advanced colour picker allowing gradients to be sampled and used as fills, in addition to single colour sampling
- Digital Scrapbook Artist provides a range of gradient fill and transparency effects.
- Digital Scrapbook Artist offers image editing and filters through its PhotoLab and also provides a dedicated background-removal tool in the form of Cutout Studio.
- Shadow tool provides an interactive method to add drop and wall shadows to any object.
- The Crop tool allows easy cropping of any object(s) including photographs.
- Blend tool.
- Filter Effects can be applied to any object, giving convincing, realistic effects such as glass, metallic, plastic and other 2D/3D filters.
- Layers Control displays previews of each element of the document in a tree-view control for powerful object management and editing.
