= Leonardo.ai =

Artificial intelligence company

Leonardo.Ai
- Type: Private
- Industry: artificial intelligence, software
- Founded: December 2022; 3 years ago
- Headquarters: Sydney, New South Wales, Australia
- Area served: Worldwide
- Key people: JJ Fiasson (CEO), Christopher Gillis, Jachin Bhasme, Peter Runham, Sami Ede, Ethan Smith
- Products: generative AI platform for image and video generation
- Number of employees: 200+ (2024)
- Parent: Canva (2024-present)
- Website: leonardo.ai

Leonardo.Ai is a global artificial intelligence company that develops generative AI software for image and video creation. In 2024, the company was acquired by Canva.

== History ==
Leonardo.Ai was founded in December 2022 in Sydney by JJ Fiasson, Christopher Gillis, Jachin Bhasme, Peter Runham, Sami Ede, and Ethan Smith.

Leonardo.Ai develops and maintains generative AI models and tools designed for creative workflows. In October 2023, the company raised A$47 million (approximately US$31 million) in Series A funding, with investors including Blackbird Ventures, Sierra Ventures, Smash Capital, TIRTA Ventures, Gaorong Capital, and Samsung Next.

In April 2024, it launched Leonardo for Teams, an enterprise solution for secure content production and collaboration, and in June introduced Phoenix, its first in-house foundational model. By the end of the year, the platform had more than 29 million users worldwide, according to Forbes Australia.

The company was included in the Forbes 2024 AI 50 list. In the same year, CEO JJ Fiasson received the Australian Financial Review's AI Trailblazer award and was recognized among Australia's Top 100 Young Entrepreneurs.

In August 2025, Lucid Origin, an advanced text-to-image model developed by Leonardo AI, was officially launched, offering full-HD output. In the same year, it was ranked #7 on the “Text-to-Image” leaderboard by Artificial Analysis.

== Products and services ==
Leonardo.Ai's core platform allows users to generate images, illustrations, and photorealistic visuals from text prompts. Features include Realtime Canvas, which transforms sketches into AI-generated images in real time, and Motion, which animates static images into short videos. The platform supports custom AI model training on user-specific datasets for consistent outputs. It also incorporates some of the latest artificial intelligence models, such as Google's Veo 3 for video generation, alongside its suite of image creation, motion, and editing tools for both individual and enterprise users.
