= Ma Ji Yong =

Chinese chain of Lanzhou beef noodle soup restaurants

Ma Ji Yong (Chinese: 马记永) is a Chinese chain of Lanzhou beef noodle soup restaurants. It was established in Shanghai in 2019. On 1 May 2021, the company received its first round of private equity investment from HongShan, Challenjers Venture, Gaorong Capital and K2 Venture Partners. As of early 2022, Ma Ji Yong operated 81 locations. On 27 January 2022, the company received investment from Tencent.
