= Pixelmator Pro =

Graphics editor for Mac developed by Apple

- Logos for the one-time purchase version (left) and Apple Creator Studio version (right)

- Original author: Pixelmator Team
- Developer: Apple Inc.
- Release: November 29, 2017; 8 years ago
- Stable release: 4.0 / January 28, 2026; 8 months ago
- Written in: Swift
- Operating system: macOS (12.0 and later, one-time purchase version; 26.0 and later, Apple Creator Studio version) iPadOS (26.0 or newer)
- Predecessor: Pixelmator Classic
- Type: Graphics software
- License: Proprietary
- Website: www.apple.com/pixelmator-pro/

Pixelmator Pro is a photo, video, and vector graphic editor developed by Apple for macOS and iPadOS as part of its Pixelmator and pro apps platforms and as a part of their Apple Creator Studio suite of applications. Pixelmator Pro relies heavily on technologies from Apple platforms such as Metal, CoreML, Core Image, AVFoundation, GCD, and SwiftUI.

== Features ==
- GPU accelerated with Metal
- 50+ standard image editing tools
- Layer-based image editor
- Video editing support
- Vector graphic support (including SVG support)
- AI-powered editing features such as background removal, ML Super Resolution and Smart Replace
- Supports a variety of media formats (JPEG, RAW, Apple ProRAW, PSD, PNG, GIF, MP4, HEIF, etc)

== Reception ==
Pixelmator Pro was generally well-received by reviewers who praised its deep use of machine learning, fully macOS-native design, and relatively affordable one-time purchase compared to subscription software such as Adobe Photoshop. Some reviewers criticized that some features are hard to find or hard to use. It was awarded Apple's Mac App of the Year in 2018.

Pixelmator Pro does not have support for panorama stitching.

== Acquisition by Apple ==
On November 1, 2024, the Pixelmator Team announced that they were to be acquired by Apple, subject to regulatory approval. Their site promises "There will be no material changes to the Pixelmator Pro, Pixelmator for iOS, and Photomator apps at this time." The acquisition was completed in February 2025.

On January 13, 2026, Apple announced that a new version of Pixelmator Pro with AI features would be included in its new Apple Creator Studio subscription, the app would be brought to the iPad and the Mac app would be redesigned with Liquid Glass.

== Version history ==
Version	Codename	Release date	Notable changes	Ref.
1.0	Whirlwind	November 29, 2017	Initial release	
1.1	Monsoon	May 31, 2018	Added Touch Bar support; Added vector import/export support; Added SVG and HEIF support; Added slice tool; Added Tutorials	
1.2	Quicksilver	October 18, 2018	Added ML Enhance; Batch processing with Automator; Added light appearance; Supports macOS Mojave	
1.3	Prism	January 18, 2019	Added layer tagging, filters, and search; Added clip masks	
1.4	Hummingbird	July 23, 2019	Added extension for Apple Photos	
1.5	Avalon	October 10, 2019	Supports macOS Catalina; Added Sidecar support; Added ML Noise Removal; Performance improvements	
1.6	Magenta	March 30, 2020	New color picker; Notifies users if a font is missing from the system; Performance improvements; Added WebP support	
1.7	Sequoia	July 16, 2020	Added ML Super Resolution; Text can now be placed along paths, improving the ability to make rounded text; The canvas can now be freely rotated to any angle	
1.8	Lynx	September 17, 2020	Added automation with AppleScript	
2.0	Junipero	November 18, 2020	All-new design; Support for macOS Big Sur and Apple silicon Macs; Added ML Super	
2.1	Coral	June 29, 2021	Added ML Crop; Rewritten .PSD engine	
2.2	Carmel	October 25, 2021	Supports macOS Monterey; Supports Shortcuts	
2.3	Abracadabra	November 23, 2021	Added AI-powered Magic Background Eraser and Select Subject; Added Select and Mask tool; Added export to Motion	
2.4	Odesa	April 12, 2022	Added color adjustments layers; Redesigned layers sidebar; Added new vector shapes	
3.0	Muse	September 22, 2022	Added 200+ design templates and 16 editable mockups; Added AI-powered Smart Replace	
3.1	Fortuna	November 2, 2022	Supports macOS Ventura; Added AVIF support	
3.2	Lumière	December 6, 2022	Added video editing (with accompanying new templates); Added support for MP4, MOV, and other video formats; Added ML-based deband	
3.3	Mosaic	February 28, 2023	Added Remove Color feature; Added Shadow and Highlight Recovery; Added Stroke Styles	
3.4	Camelot	September 11, 2023	Added advanced PDF support; Added Convert to PDF Shortcut	
3.5	Flare	December 13, 2023	Full HDR support; Full macOS Sonoma support	
3.6	Archipelago	May 23, 2024	Redesigned masking; AI background masks; Full masking compability	
3.7	—N/a	June 30, 2025	Support for Apple Intelligence features; Image Playground integration; Writing Tools integration	
4.0	—N/a	January 28, 2026	Now part of Apple Creator Studio	

== Applescript ==
In 2020 Pixelmator Pro added the ability to leverage Apple's automation language 'AppleScript' to automate many tasks in version 1.8 (Lynx). This enabled simple and advanced automation activities such as image resize, crop, color adjustments, format change, moving layers around, and more advanced actions like removing background, Gaussian blur, text replacement, shadows, color replacement, etc.

== See also ==
- Adobe Photoshop
- Adobe Lightroom
- Affinity
- Pixelmator
- Pixelmator Classic
- List of 2D graphics software
