= Serif products =

Software products by Serif Europe

Serif (Europe) Ltd, a subsidiary of Canva, is a British software developer and publisher; they have a range of software products, which are listed below.

== Maintained products ==
=== Affinity ===
Affinity is a freemium alternative to the Adobe Creative Cloud. It is available as a desktop app for macOS and Windows. An iPadOS version is in development.

Prior to being acquired by Canva, Serif offered Affinity Designer, Affinity Photo, and Affinity Publisher, three apps which respectively handled illustration, photo editing, and page layouts. After the acquisition, Canva combined the three apps into Affinity by Canva, relaunching them and moving to a freemium model.

Affinity is free aside from its AI tools (Canva AI Studio), which can be accessed via a Canva subscription.

== Discontinued products ==
=== Affinity Designer ===
Affinity Designer is a vector graphics editor for macOS, Windows, and iOS. It is Serif's first macOS app and has been built from the ground up to take full advantage of core Mac technologies including Grand Central Dispatch, Core Graphics, and OpenGL hardware acceleration.

Affinity Designer supports panning and zooming at 60fps, transforming objects in correct z-order, real-time adjustments and effects, and zoom levels exceeding 1,000,000%.

Affinity Designer has been very well received by critics and was awarded runner up in Apple's “Best of 2014″, and won an Apple Design Award (ADA) at Apple's WWDC event in San Francisco.

Affinity Designer is available as a free 30-day trial from the Affinity website, and available to buy direct from the Mac App store or from their website.

=== Affinity Photo ===
Affinity Photo is a raster graphics editor for macOS, Windows, and iOS. It is Serif's second macOS app, and like Affinity Designer has been built from the ground up to take full advantage of core Mac technologies including Grand Central Dispatch, Core Graphics and OpenGL hardware acceleration.

Like Designer, working in Affinity Photo is always live and can pan and zoom at 60fps, with live previews and non destructive application. It support unlimited layers and has a dedicated RAW editing workspace. It supports RGB, CMYK, LAB, Greyscale colour space with end-to-end CMYK workflow with ICC colour management, and 16-bit per channel editing.

Affinity Photo is available as a free trial from the Affinity website, and available to buy direct from the Mac App store or from their website.

=== Affinity Publisher ===
Affinity Publisher is a desktop publishing application for macOS and Windows. It is Serif's third macOS app.

Affinity Publisher includes StudioLink technology, developed by Serif, which allows owners of Affinity Designer and Affinity Photo to use the vector and raster graphic editing functionality of those applications for editing content directly within Publisher (in addition to its own, smaller set of native vector and raster editing features).

=== Serif PagePlus ===
Serif PagePlus is a desktop publishing (DTP, page layout) program developed by Serif. The first version was released in 1991 as the first commercial sub-£100 DTP package for Microsoft Windows. Serif's latest releases all support Windows Vista, Windows 7, Windows 8 and Windows 10.

PagePlus is primarily written in C++ using Visual Studio 2008, with a heavy dependence on the Microsoft MFC framework. The Windows GDI library was discarded early in development in favour of an in-house composition engine - supporting advanced bitmap and typeface operations. Said engine currently performs well in comparison to other GDI based products.

PagePlus is generally targeted at the entry-level DTP user, much of the functionality present in market leading applications from companies such as Adobe Systems is present in PagePlus, such as working in the CMYK colour space. PagePlus also has the ability to view, create, edit and publish PDF files. However Serif has failed to achieve much acceptance within professional circles, partly due to the notable absence of Macintosh versions of its products.

There is a free version of the software, called PagePlus Starter Edition. It is based on an older version of the software and some of the features have been disabled. In order to use this software, the user must download and install the program, then get an activation code through their email in order to unlock the software. The user has access to free designs and templates to download at the site.

=== Serif DrawPlus ===
Serif DrawPlus is a vector graphics editor for Microsoft Windows. The latest version, DrawPlus X8, is compatible with Windows XP, Vista, Windows 7, Windows 8 and Windows 10.

It has many features that can be expected in such a program, such as graphical effects, gradient fills, transparency, animation and image slicing, and is capable of producing professional, high-quality images.

DrawPlus was often criticised for not supporting the SVG format despite being a vector graphics editor. However, as of version X4 this SVG support has been added.

Like PagePlus, there is a free version of the software, called DrawPlus Starter Edition that is based on an older version of the software with some of the features disabled.

=== Serif PhotoPlus ===
Serif PhotoPlus is an image editing program for Microsoft Windows. The latest version is Serif PhotoPlus X8 and is compatible with Windows XP (SP2, 32 bit), Windows Vista, Windows 7, Windows 8 and Windows 10.

As well as a number of easy to use editing functions such as the PhotoFix and Makeover studios, PhotoPlus also has some features commonly found in higher end products, such as RAW image import, 16-bit end-to-end editing, high DPI support, High Dynamic Range image merging and LAB colour mode. PhotoPlus boasts some other features which are not commonly found in photo editing software such as non-destructive crop and adjustments, intelligent quick shapes, and a comprehensive image export optimizer.

PhotoPlus is available both as a paid-for version (not subscription based like Adobe Photoshop), or as a cut-down Starter Edition which is completely free.

=== Serif WebPlus ===
WebPlus is a web design program for Microsoft Windows, developed by UK-based software company Serif. It allows users to design, create and upload their website onto the internet without any knowledge of HTML or other web technologies.

Much like Microsoft Word, WebPlus uses WYSIWYG (what you see is what you get) drag-and-drop editing to add and position text, images and links as they would appear on the finished web page. Once a user has designed their site, WebPlus can preview the site in a web browser before uploading the site using the in-built FTP.

The software comes with a variety of pre-designed websites which can be used as a template for quickly designing a site. It also provides drawing tools for creating and editing buttons and web graphics.

WebPlus is available both as a paid-for version, WebPlus X8, or as a cut-down Starter Edition which is completely free.

=== Serif MoviePlus ===
Serif MoviePlus is a non-linear editing system created by Serif that allows both professional and home users to edit digital video and digital images.

The latest release, MoviePlus X6, runs on Microsoft Windows XP, Windows Vista, Windows 7 and Windows 8.

From the early 2000s, MoviePlus has developed an enthusiastic user base. Originally, it was designed largely for editing video from MiniDV camcorders, largely to produce DVDs. Version 4 released in 2004 was a complete re-write of the previous Version 1. It included the ability to edit and generate Windows Media files and MPEG files as well as DV-AVI. Version 4 ran on Windows 98 SE, Me, 2000 and XP. The current version X6 has added many new features including the capability to edit and generate QuickTime, MPEG-4 and High Definition HDV files.

MoviePlus is affordable and popular with home and semi-professional filmmakers. It can be used to edit material from FireWire-attached MiniDV video from a consumer digital video camera, professional DV camera or HDV camera. The software captures video onto the computer's hard drive, where it can be edited and processed. The result can be recorded on MiniDV tape, converted into a format suitable for replaying on a PC, converted into a format suitable for uploading to a web site, or burning onto a DVD. The current version of MoviePlus X6 requires a minimum of an Intel Pentium 4 Hyper-Threading processor or AMD Athlon XP processor and 1 GB of RAM.

=== Serif CraftArtist ===
CraftArtist (formerly known as Serif Digital Scrapbook Artist) is a digital scrapbooking program for Microsoft Windows.

It has many standard vector graphics features, and also includes features designed specifically for digital scrapbooking such as intelligent photo frames, a cut-out studio, photo adjustments and realistic filters effects. It also includes a selection of high resolution photographic assets, and is capable of exporting 300 DPI images for print or upload to photo sharing websites.
