= Poizon =

Online marketplace

- Type: Private
- Industry: E-commerce
- Founded: 2015
- Founder: Yang Bing (CEO)
- Headquarters: Shanghai
- Products: Sneakers, garments, and accessories
- Website: www.poizon.com

Poizon (stylized in all caps), also known as Dewu, is an online marketplace founded in 2015. Specializing in the trade of sneakers, it is also involved in the second-hand market. It set up a product authentication center in Shanghai. The platform primarily targets Gen Z. In April 2019, it achieved unicorn status. As of 2019, its annual transaction volume reached more than €1.9 billion, which was more than triple that of StockX.

Poizon was funded by Gaorong Capital, and Digital Sky Technologies. Its main products are branded sneakers, apparel, and accessories. On this shopping site, luxury items are often sold at large discounts. Initially launched as a sneaker forum, it became a marketplace in 2017. As of June 2022, it was valued at more than $10 billion. Currently, POIZON is focused on the Asian market.

== History ==
Poizon was established by Yang Bing in 2015. Before its transformation into an e-marketplace, the platform was mainly engaged in sneaker trading. As of November 2019, its monthly active users surpassed 10 million.

As of June 2022, the number of MAUs on Poizon amounted to approximately 100 million. By October 2024, the app had been downloaded more than 350 million times.
