= Sarif =

Sarif may refer to:

- Şərif, Azerbaijan
- Sarif, Saudi Arabia, site of the 1901 Battle of Sarif during the Kuwaiti–Rashidi war
- Sarif Industries, a fictional company featured in the 2011 video game Deus Ex: Human Revolution
- Static Analysis Results Interchange Format, a file format standardized by OASIS

== See also ==
- Serif (disambiguation)
