= XTransfer =

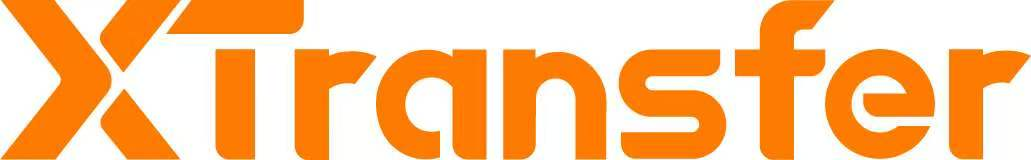
- Type: Private
- Founded: May 2017
- Founders: Bill Deng; 5 other Ali alumni
- Headquarters: Shanghai
- Area served: Worldwide
- Key people: Bill Deng (CEO)
- Website: www.xtransfer.com

XTransfer, registered in Hong Kong as XTransfer Ltd., is a Chinese fintech company founded in May 2017. Headquartered in Shanghai, it focuses on providing SMEs with cross-border financial services. The company also offers risk management and banking compliance services. It serves enterprises within and outside China. As of March 2022, its valuation reached $1 billion.

XTransfer co-founders are six Alibaba alumni, including Bill Deng. Among the company's backers are Gaorong Capital, D1 Capital Partners, and MindWorks Capital. In January 2024, XTransfer CEO attended the World Economic Forum. In January 2025, it obtained a payment license in mainland China. In February of the same year, the company inked an agreement with Ecobank.

== History ==
XTransfer was established in 2017. In 2018, it was backed by Yunqi Partners. In September 2021, it secured a $138 million round of funding. In 2024, it entered into a partnership with Deutsche Bank.

In 2024, XTransfer launched its TradePilot LLM model. In the same year, it secured in-principle approval for a major payment institution license from the MAS of Singapore. In January 2025, the license was issued by the MAS.
