= Susan Wu (entrepreneur) =

American tech entrepreneur

- Born: 1976 (age 49–50); Taiwan
- Education: Tufts University, Cornell University
- Occupation: Angel investor
- Known for: Technology entrepreneur

Susan Wu (1976-) was an American tech entrepreneur and angel investor known for her participation in movement Project Include and for being one of the founders of the Lumineer Academy as well as Ohai.

== Education and career ==
Susan Wu graduated from Tufts University with a Bachelor of Arts and from Cornell University with a Master of Business Administration with distinction. After her education, Susan Wu became an angel investor and advisor. She became an early investor in multi-billion-dollar companies such as Twitter and Canva. From 2013 to 2016, Wu led the company Stripe.

Wu co-founded Project Include, which aims to provide guidance to companies, especially startups, to improve diversity and inclusion in the workplace. Wu founded Ohai, a large online gaming company that invested in the U.S. virtual goods market very early. The companies investments in social network specific massively multiplayer online games are what struck their popularity and profiled Wu as the top influential woman in technology, according to Fast Company.

Wu co-founded Lumineer Academy, a primary school in Melbourne, Australia. Wu co-founded with a group of educators a new teaching model called Luminaria, to support children to thrive in their futures of innovation and creativity by accommodating the complexities of difficult STEM subjects when teaching the youth.

Wu spoke out against Chris Sacca, a former Google executive, who she alleged touched her face without consent, an account that Sacca disputed. Wu also claimed she was propositioned by Binary Capital investor Justin Caldbeck.
