= Affinity Publisher =

Desktop publishing application

- Affinity Publisher 2.6.5 running on Windows 11
- Developer: Serif Europe
- Release: 19 June 2019; 7 years ago
- Final release: 2.6.5 / 27 October 2025; 12 months ago
- Operating system: iPadOS, macOS and Windows
- Predecessor: PagePlus
- Available in: 9 languages
- List of languages English, German, Spanish, French, Italian, Portuguese, Japanese, Chinese, Russian
- Type: Desktop Publisher
- License: Proprietary commercial software
- Website: affinity.serif.com/publisher/

Affinity Publisher is a discontinued desktop publishing application developed by Serif for macOS, Microsoft Windows and iPadOS.

Developed as a successor to Serif’s PagePlus and first released in 2019, Affinity Publisher was part of a suite alongside Affinity Designer and Affinity Photo, respectively a vector graphics editor and raster graphics editor.

Affinity used a perpetual license model. In 2025, following the purchase of Serif by Canva in 2024, it was replaced by the freemium Affinity application, bundling layout, vector and raster features together.

== Overview ==
Affinity Publisher serves as a successor to Serif's own PagePlus software, which the company discontinued in August 2017 to focus on the Affinity product range. It has been described as an alternative to Adobe InDesign, due to its primary focus on desktop publishing workflows for both printed and online media, including common features from this industry, such as master pages, OpenType support, linked text frames, and end-to-end support for the CMYK colour model.

In addition to its own, smaller set of native editing features, the native vector and raster functionality of Affinity Designer and Affinity Photo can be used to edit content directly within Affinity Publisher when they are installed on the same device ("StudioLink").

=== File format support ===
File formats supported by Affinity Publisher (in addition to the Affinity suite's native file format) include Adobe InDesign Markup Language (only import of IDML files into Publisher, no export of IDML), Adobe Photoshop PSD, PDF, JPG, TIFF, PNG, and EPS, with export functionality for the PDF/X-1a, PDF/X-3, PDF/X-4 standards of the PDF/X file format.

The iPadOS editions of Affinity Photo and Designer also include support for Affinity Publisher files.

== Development ==
Affinity Publisher icon history

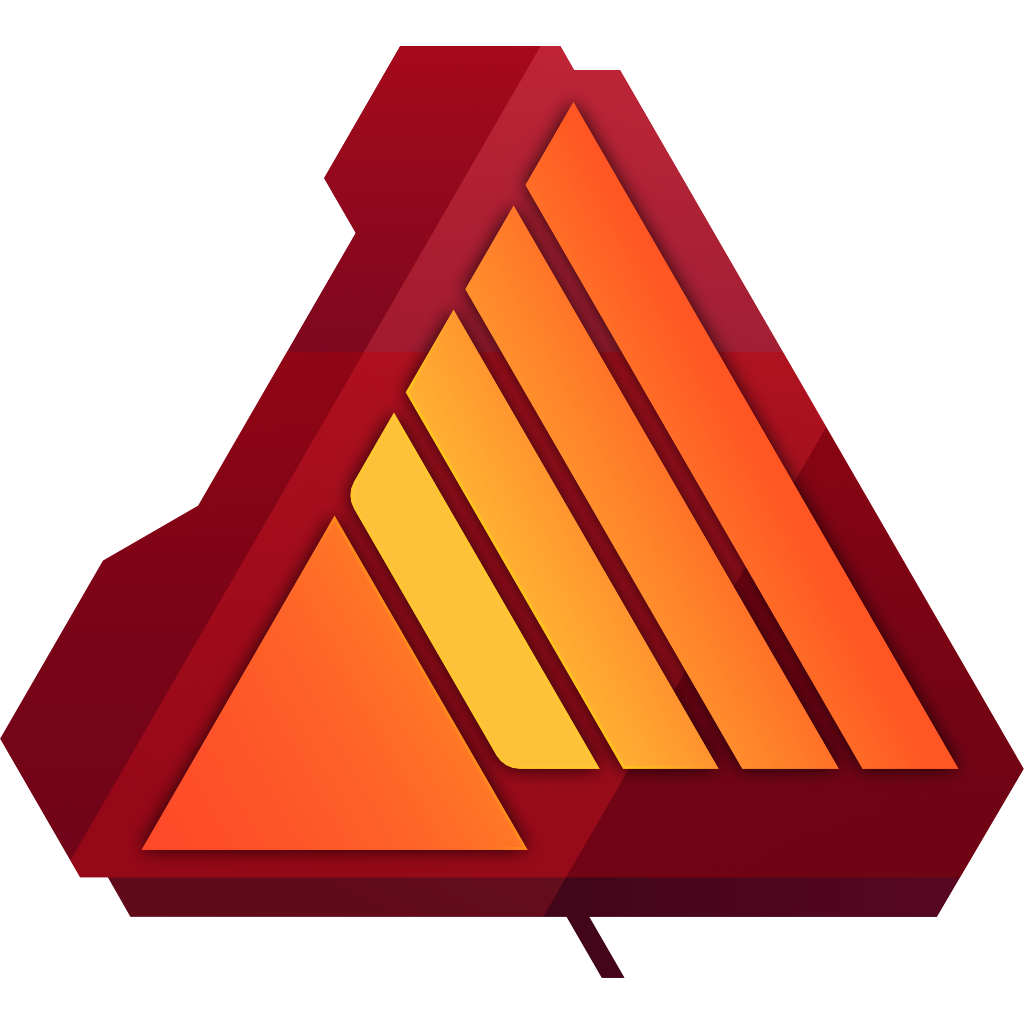
Beta icon

v1 icon

v2 icon

=== Release ===
The first promotional video for Affinity Publisher was shown by Serif in December 2017, demonstrating features such as the drag & drop functionality, and text flow between frames. A free public beta of the software was made available for both macOS and Windows on August 30, 2018.

The first full version of Publisher (using the 1.7 version number, to align with other Affinity products) was first released on June 19, 2019, in conjunction with Serif's 2019 'Affinity Live' event, during which the company also announced the "StudioLink" integration features for the first time. Publisher was made available for purchase directly from Serif's website and also available from the Mac App Store and Microsoft Store.

Publisher was updated to version 1.8 in February 2020, introducing support for importing Adobe InDesign's IDML file format. Version 1.9 was released in February 2021, adding speed improvements, with Serif claiming that certain tasks would be up to 10 times as fast.

=== Version 2 ===
Serif stated that an iPadOS version of the software was planned for release in 2020; it was eventually added in 2022 as part of the 2.0 update to the Affinity suite.

=== Version 3 and merge into Affinity ===
Icon for the combined Affinity v3

In October 2025, Affinity Publisher was discontinued in favour of the freemium Affinity by Canva, which has unified the functionality of the three separate Affinity applications.

== Reception ==
Affinity Publisher received generally favorable reviews following its initial release in 2019, with the application's range of features, its StudioLink integration with Affinity Designer/Photo, and non-subscription pricing model commonly cited as positive areas. Limitations noted by reviewers of the initial release included its lack of support for InDesign's document (INDD) and markup (IDML) files (although Serif added IDML support in February 2020), for footnotes & endnotes, and for GREP-based and nested styles.

Many reviews drew comparisons between Publisher and InDesign, often noting that Publisher's first release did not have all of the features required to serve as a full replacement; however, CreativePro also acknowledged it as having additional tools that are not present in InDesign or other desktop publishing applications.

In December 2019, Apple named Publisher the “Mac App of the Year”.

== See also ==
- Comparison of desktop publishing software
- List of desktop publishing software
