= MoviePlus =

Serif MoviePlus
- MoviePlus X5
- Developer: Serif
- Release: 2003; 23 years ago
- Stable release: X6 / March 5, 2012; 14 years ago
- Operating system: Microsoft Windows
- Type: Video editing software
- License: Proprietary
- Website: www.serif.com/movieplus

Serif MoviePlus was a non-linear video editor created by Serif Europe that allowed both professional and home users to edit digital video and digital images.

This software is no longer supported, as Serif are concentrating on their Affinity range.

MoviePlus was affordable and popular with home and semi-professional filmmakers. It can be used to edit material from FireWire-attached MiniDV video from a consumer digital video camera, professional DV camera or HDV camera. The software captures video onto the computer's hard drive, where it can be edited and processed. The result can be recorded on MiniDV tape, converted into a format suitable for replaying on a PC, converted into a format suitable for uploading to a web site, or burning onto a DVD. The current version of MoviePlus X6 requires a minimum of an Intel Pentium 4 Hyper-Threading processor or AMD Athlon XP processor and 1 GB of RAM.

== History ==
From the early 2000s (decade), MoviePlus has developed an enthusiastic user base. Originally, it was designed largely for editing video from MiniDV camcorders, largely to produce DVDs.

- MoviePlus 1 (2003)
- MoviePlus 4 (March 2004)
- MoviePlus 5 (March 2006)
- MoviePlus X3 (August 2008)
- MoviePlus X5 (February 2011)
- MoviePlus X6 (March 2012, current version)(no longer supported)

== Features ==
MoviePlus provides non-linear, non-destructive editing of any compatible video format. It supports unlimited simultaneously composited video tracks; unlimited audio tracks; as well as standard ripple, roll, slip, slide, scrub, razor blade and time remapping edit functions. It comes with a range of dissolve, iris, distortion and basic 3D transitions and a range of video filters.

MoviePlus, like all current NLE systems also has the ability to up-convert standard definition material to high definition as well as the ability to cross-convert video of differing frame rates. Like many similar products, all rendering is performed in software rather than in hardware: Rendering is a slow process, even on a fast computer.

== Interface ==
MoviePlus X6 is based around the Timeline, which can accommodate multiple Overlay, Music, video and audio tracks, either singly or organized into groups. Video and audio sources and images can be organized in a Media Panel and then dragged onto the appropriate part of the Timeline. Using an in-built file browser, they can also be dragged direct from any disk location.

Once on the timeline, the tools in MoviePlus can be used to non-destructively edit, manipulate and re-arrange these source. All actions can be previewed using the Video Preview screen. The Properties panel displays detailed information about any selected source and permits detailed adjustments. There are two audio level indicators for the left and right audio channels. The positions and sizes of these panel can be changed and while using multiple computer monitors, the different panels can be moved onto different monitors.

MoviePlus has a shuttle interface (for variable-speed scanning through a clip, forwards or backwards) and a jogging interface (for frame-by-frame advancing).

MoviePlus X3 added a storyboard mode which simplifies editing for linear projects and cleaner and simpler interface.

== Project Files ==
Like similar digital non-linear editing applications, MoviePlus does not actually alter the media sources; it builds a small "project file" which contains links to all media sources used, together with details of virtual edits, transitions, special effects and titling.

Note: The project file contains only links to the locations of the sources; it does not contain the actual sources.

When the completed movie is exported, MoviePlus uses this project file to build, render and encode the movie. If a media source has been moved to a different location on the hard disk, MoviePlus issues a warning and allows the operator to find the new location or to remove the source from that movie. If several media sources have been moved to similar new locations, MoviePlus can quickly re-connect with the whole group.

== Key Frames ==
Effects and envelopes are introduced by placing special "Key Frames" on a track of the timeline. Each of these key frames holds information about the "effect" to be applied at that instant to a particular media source. For example: The opacity, colour or zoom of a video source; the volume or pan of an audio source; the pan, zoom, rotation of an image. Key-framed changes can be applied at the source, track, or group level.

== Computer Generated Sources ==
MoviePlus provides computer generated sources for coloured backgrounds, shapes and masks, and text in a variety of styles. These can be adjusted and dragged to the timeline.

== Advanced editing and Blending modes ==
MoviePlus supports an unlimited number of Overlay, Music, video and audio tracks, as well as Video tracks groups for linking elements together. Blending modes like the ones in Adobe Photoshop are also possible, enabling advanced blending with Overlay or Multiply effects that are generally not common on entry-level packages.

== See also ==
- List of video editing software
- Comparison of video editing software
