= Paint.NET =

Freeware graphics editor

- Paint.NET version 5.1
- Original author: Rick Brewster
- Developers: dotPDN, LLC
- Release: May 6, 2004; 22 years ago
- Stable release: 5.1.12 / 8 March 2026
- Written in: C#, C++, C++/CLI
- Operating system: Windows 10 or later
- Platform: x86-64, ARM64.NET Framework and .NET
- Size: 79.5 MB
- Available in: 36 languages
- List of languages English, Belarusian, Bulgarian, Catalan, Chinese (Simplified), Chinese (Traditional), Corsican, Czech, Danish, Dutch, Finnish, French, German, Greek, Hebrew, Hindi, Hungarian, Italian, Japanese, Kazakh, Korean, Latvian, Lithuanian, Norwegian, Persian, Polish, Portuguese (Brazil), Portuguese (Portugal), Russian, Romanian, Slovak, Slovenian, Spanish, Swedish, Thai, Turkish, Ukrainian
- Type: Raster graphics editor
- License: Freeware
- Website: paint.net

Paint.NET (sometimes stylized as paint.net) is a freeware general-purpose raster graphics editor program for Microsoft Windows, developed with the .NET platform. Paint.NET was originally created by Rick Brewster as a Washington State University student project intended as a free replacement for Microsoft Paint. It has since added layers, a range of effects and adjustments, GPU-accelerated rendering, color management, and support for plugins.

The program uses a tabbed interface to work on several images at once and records every edit in a history that can be undone and redone. Layered images are saved in its native .PDN format, and common formats such as PNG, JPEG, GIF, and WebP can also be opened and saved. Plugins, most of them written by volunteers on the program's online forum, add further effects and file types. Successive versions added optional GPU acceleration (version 4.0, 2014), native support for ARM64 processors (4.3, 2021), and color management (5.1, 2024), while version 5.0 (2023) ended support for Windows 7, Windows 8.1, and 32-bit systems. In 2026, an alpha release added experimental support for running under WINE on Linux.

Paint.NET's source code was originally released under a modified MIT License, but in 2007 Brewster announced plans to restrict access to parts of it, and the software became proprietary in 2009. A classic edition is freeware, and a paid edition has been sold through the Microsoft Store since 2017. Pinta is a clone of Paint.NET for Mono and Gtk#. Reviews in PCWorld and TechRadar cited its ease of use as a strength and its limited feature set as a weakness.

== History ==
Paint.NET originated as a computer science senior design project by Rick Brewster during spring 2004 at Washington State University. Version 1.0 consisted of 36,000 lines of code and was written in four months. In contrast, version 3.35 has approximately 162,000 lines of code. The Paint.NET project continued over the summer and into the autumn 2004 semester for both the version 1.1 and 2.0 releases.

Development continued with one programmer who worked on previous versions of Paint.NET while he was a student at WSU. As of May 2006 the program had been downloaded at least 2 million times, at a rate of about 180,000 per month.

Initially, Paint.NET was released under a modified version of the MIT License, with the exclusion of the installer, text, and graphics. However, citing issues with the open source code being plagiarized by others that had rebranded the software as their own and bundled user content without their permission, the availability of the source code was restricted, in December 2007 Brewster announced his intent to restrict access to components of the program (including its installer, resources, and user interface). In November 2009, the software was made proprietary, restricting the sale or creation of derivative works of the software.

Starting with version 4.0.18, Paint.NET is published in two editions: A classic edition remains freeware, similar to all other versions since 3.5. Another edition, however, is published to Microsoft Store under a trialware license and is available to purchase for US$14.99. According to the developer, this was done to enable the users to contribute to the development with more convenience, even though the old avenue of donation was not closed.

In May 2026, Brewster revealed that he obtained the paint.net domain after attempting to do so for 22 years. Historically, the editor was hosted on getpaint.net, and according to Brewster, the previous owners of paint.net would not sell the domain and asked for "lots and lots of money". In December of the previous year, paint.net began hosting content that impersonated Paint.NET, therefore becoming a clear case of trademark infringement and domain squatting. Brewster stated that he was able to obtain the domain afterwards with the help of a lawyer.

Rick Brewster
(@rickbrewPDN)
tweeted:

I GOT THE DOMAIN! I FINALLY GOT IT!!!!!!!!!!1 🥳🎉

Paint.NET is now at paint.net!

Well, it will be just as soon as I push all the buttons to migrate content and set up redirects from getpaint.net etc. For now it's just a "hey go here" redirect page.

May 29, 2026

In August 2026, Brewster published Paint.NET Alpha (build 9739), introducing experimental support for running the application under WINE on Linux.

== Features ==
Paint.NET uses a tabbed document interface in which each open image is represented by a live thumbnail. Images can be built from multiple layers, each with its own opacity and blend mode. Every action performed on an image is recorded in a History window, where it can be undone and redone, and the length of the history is limited only by available disk space. Selection tools include a Magic Wand that selects areas of similar color. Drawing tools include a paintbrush, pencil, eraser, gradient, clone stamp, recolor tool, text tool, and a shapes tool that can draw lines and Bézier curves. Brush tools support pressure sensitivity on pens and drawing tablets that use Windows Ink.

Built-in effects include blurs, sharpening, distortions, noise, embossing, and red-eye removal, along with a 3D Rotate/Zoom effect that adds perspective and tilt. Adjustments include brightness and contrast, hue and saturation, curves, and levels, as well as conversion to black and white or sepia.

Paint.NET edits images in an RGB color model with an alpha channel for transparency, and CMYK images are converted to RGB when they are opened. Version 5.1 added color management, which displays images according to their embedded color profiles and, on high dynamic range or wide color gamut displays, uses Windows Advanced Color to show the display's full range of colors.

Paint.NET is primarily programmed in the C# programming language. Rendering of the canvas can use the graphics processing unit (GPU) through Direct2D, and most effects and adjustments are processed on the GPU when compatible hardware is available, with the CPU used otherwise.

== File formats ==
Paint.NET's native image format, .PDN, is a compressed representation of the application's internal object format, which preserves layering and other information. A .PDN file consists of a header and structural information, such as the number of layers, followed by the pixel data of each layer, which is compressed with gzip in blocks of 256 kilobytes.

Paint.NET can also open and save images in the PNG, JPEG, JPEG XL, AVIF, HEIC, WebP, JPEG XR, BMP, GIF, TIFF, DDS, and TGA formats, and plugins can add support for others. Version 4.2.2 (2019) raised the maximum image size from 65,535 to 262,144 pixels in each dimension.

As of October 2026, the developer's roadmap lists a new .PDN format for version 6.0, which is planned for release in 2027. The new format is intended to support higher bit depths, layer groups, and additional layer types, and it is to have public documentation.

== Plugins ==
Paint.NET supports plugins, which add image adjustments, effects, and support for additional file types. They can be programmed using any .NET Framework programming language, though they are most commonly written in C#. These are created by volunteer coders on the program's discussion board, the Paint.NET Forum. Though most are simply published via the discussion board, some have been included with a later release of the program. For instance, a DirectDraw Surface file type plugin, (originally by Dean Ashton) and an Ink Sketch and Soften Portrait effect (originally by David Issel) were added to Paint.NET in version 3.10.

Hundreds of plugins have been produced; such as Shape3D, which renders a 2D drawing into a 3D shape. Some plugins expand on the functionality that comes with Paint.NET, such as Curves+ and Sharpen+, which extend the included tools Curves and Sharpen, respectively.

Examples of file type plugins include an Animated Cursor and Icon plugin and an Adobe Photoshop file format plugin. Several of these plugins are based on existing open source software, such as a raw image format plugin that uses dcraw and a PNG optimization plugin that uses OptiPNG.

Plugin support dates to version 2.0, released in late 2004, which included a public programming interface for creating effects. Version 5.0 (2023) introduced a new effect plugin system that supports both CPU and GPU rendering, and the earlier effect system was deprecated in version 5.1 (2024). Beginning with version 4.2.2 (2019), Paint.NET has bundled community-developed file type plugins, including an expanded DDS plugin (4.2.2), WebP (4.2.5, 2019), AVIF (4.2.14, 2020), and JPEG XL (5.1.5, 2025).

== Version history ==
=== Versions 1 and 2 ===
Version 2.0, released in late 2004, added support for layers and a public programming interface for creating effects. By version 2.1 in 2005, each layer could have its own transparency and blend mode, and the program could open and save BMP, JPEG, GIF, PNG, and TIFF images in addition to its native format. It ran on Windows 2000, Windows XP, and Windows Server 2003.

=== Version 3 ===
Version 3.0, released on January 26, 2007, introduced a tabbed multiple-document interface and required the .NET Framework 2.0. Version 3.5, released on November 6, 2009, updated the interface for the Aero theme of Windows Vista and Windows 7 and used DirectWrite for text rendering on Windows 7. Support for Windows XP and Windows Vista ended after the 3.5 series.

=== Version 4 ===
Version 4.0, released on June 24, 2014, required Windows 7 with Service Pack 1 and the .NET Framework 4.5. It introduced an asynchronous, multithreaded rendering engine and optional hardware acceleration through Direct2D. Version 4.1 (September 5, 2018) moved several effects, including Gaussian, motion, and radial blur, to the GPU. Version 4.2 (July 13, 2019) added support for HEIC images, and later updates in the 4.2 series added JPEG XR, AVIF, and WebP support and raised the maximum image size. Version 4.3 (September 22, 2021) moved the program from the .NET Framework to .NET 5, added native support for ARM64 processors, and introduced a portable version.

=== Version 5 ===
Version 5.0, released on January 10, 2023, moved to .NET 7 and required 64-bit Windows 10 (version 1809 or later) or Windows 11, ending support for Windows 7, Windows 8.1, and 32-bit systems. It added pressure sensitivity for pens and drawing tablets, rewrote most effects and adjustments to run on the GPU, and introduced a new effect plugin system. Version 5.1, released on November 12, 2024, moved to .NET 9, raised the minimum operating system to Windows 10 version 21H2, and added color management and support for high dynamic range and wide color gamut displays. Version 5.1.5 added support for JPEG XL images in March 2025.

== Reception ==
PCWorld ranked Paint.NET 19th in its list of the 100 best products of 2007. A PCWorld review of version 3.5 by Rick Broida recommended it as a free alternative for users who wanted to edit images without buying Photoshop. The review listed its tutorials and online community among its strengths and said that its features were limited without plugins. TechRadar's 2017 review described it as a fully featured alternative to more complex editors such as GIMP, with simplicity as its main strength, but wrote that it was not powerful enough to replace Photoshop. In 2022, Paint.NET was one of two winners, along with Canva, of the Microsoft Store Editor's Choice Award in the Creativity – Graphics and 3D category.

== Forks ==
=== paint-mono ===
Paint.NET was created exclusively for Windows and has no native support for other operating systems. Due to its former open-source licensing, the development of alternative versions was possible. In May 2007, Miguel de Icaza officially started a porting project called paint-mono. This project had partially ported Paint.NET 3.0 to Mono, an open-source implementation of the Common Language Infrastructure on which the .NET Framework is based. This allowed Paint.NET to be run on Mono-supported platforms, such as Linux. This port is no longer maintained and has not been updated since March 2009.

Newer Mono runtime 6 versions are able to run original Paint.NET releases up to 3.5.11 with only minor issues.

=== Pinta ===
In 2010, developer Jonathan Pobst started a project called Pinta, describing it as a clone of Paint.NET for Mono and Gtk#. Pinta reused the adjustments and effects code from Paint.NET but otherwise is original code.

== See also ==
- Image editing
- Comparison of raster graphics editors
- List of raster graphics editors
- List of free software
