= Serif Europe =

British software developer and publisher

Serif (Europe) Ltd
- Type: Subsidiary
- Industry: Software
- Founded: 1987; 39 years ago
- Headquarters: West Bridgford, Nottinghamshire, United Kingdom
- Products: List of Serif products
- Number of employees: 90 (2024)
- Parent: Vizacom (1996–2001); Canva (2024–present)
- Website: www.affinity.studio

Serif (Europe) Ltd (known as Roleage Ltd before 1988) is a British software developer and publisher, best known for its Affinity suite of professional graphic design, photo editing, and desktop publishing software. The company delivers products directly to consumers through its dedicated website and contact centre, as well as through various retailers.

In March 2024, it was acquired by Canva for US$380 million.

== History ==
Serif was founded in 1987 by a small team of software engineers, with the objective of creating lower-cost alternatives to existing Desktop Publishing (DTP) software packages using the Microsoft Windows platform.

The first Serif product to be released was called PageStar: a simple, low-cost advertisement layout program for Windows 2.0. This was expanded in 1990 with their follow-up, PagePlus (originally for Windows 3.0), which would go on to win 'Best Software' at the Computer Shopper Awards 2014. In subsequent years, this was accompanied by other software products in the 'Plus' range, including DrawPlus (1994), PhotoPlus (1999), WebPlus (2000), and MoviePlus (2003).

In 1996, Serif was acquired by American company Vizacom (formerly known as Allegro New Media); however, ownership was sold back to Serif senior management in 2001.

The successor to their DrawPlus product, Affinity Designer (a vector art & design package), was launched in 2014 for macOS. It was Serif's first product for macOS, and had been written from scratch specifically for it. This was followed in 2015 by the second Affinity product (and successor to PhotoPlus), Affinity Photo (a photo editing & design package).

In 2016, following the release of Affinity Designer and Affinity Photo for Windows, Serif ceased development for their 'Plus' product range to focus exclusively on the Affinity product range. Support for the legacy product range ended in July 2022.

Affinity Designer is considered an Adobe Illustrator alternative and is cross-platform with versions available for iPadOS, macOS and Windows. It supports both vector and raster design artwork, with powerful tools and a budget-friendly price. Affinity Designer was selected as the winner of the "Best Software For Designers" Award in the 2022 Creative Bloq Awards. It was also one of the winners of the 2015 Apple Design Award.

Affinity Photo has been described as an Adobe Photoshop alternative, and is compatible with common file formats such as Adobe's PSD (including Photoshop Smart Objects). In 2023 Amateur Photographer presented Affinity Photo the Photo Editing Software of the Year award.

Affinity Publisher, the successor to PagePlus and the third addition to the Affinity product line, was released in 2019. It has been described as an alternative to Adobe InDesign, due to its primary focus on desktop publishing workflows for both printed and online media, including common features from this industry, such as master pages, OpenType support, linked text frames, and end-to-end support for the CMYK colour model.

=== Acquisition by Canva ===
On 26 March 2024, Serif announced it had been acquired by the Australian company Canva for approximately US$380 million. This acquisition was named as part of Canva's strategy to expand its global footprint and enhance its software offerings. Following the acquisition, Serif has stated that there are no immediate changes to its pricing model, and both companies have committed to maintaining Affinity's perpetual licensing model, along with offering free licenses to schools and nonprofits.

On 30 October 2025, Canva announced a major change in business model, in which the Affinity suite was deprecated and replaced with a new unified application simply known as Affinity. The application now uses a freemium model monetised via optional Canva AI features available to Canva Pro subscribers.

== Products ==
The following are all software packages, for the following applications:

=== Current products ===
- Affinity: Vector and raster graphics editor for macOS, Windows and iPad

=== Discontinued products ===
- Affinity Designer: Vector graphic design software for macOS, Windows and iPad
- Affinity Photo: Digital image editing software for macOS, Windows and iPad
- Affinity Publisher: Desktop publishing software for macOS, Windows and iPad
- PagePlus: Desktop publishing software for Windows (replaced by Affinity Publisher)
- DrawPlus: Graphic design software for Windows (replaced by Affinity Designer)
- PhotoPlus: Digital image editing software for Windows (replaced by Affinity Photo)
- WebPlus: Website design software for Windows
- MoviePlus: Digital video editing software for Windows
- ImpactPlus: 3D modeling software for Windows
- Digital Scrapbook Artist and CraftArtist: Digital scrapbooking software for Windows
- PanoramaPlus: Image stitching software for Windows
- PhotoStack: Image editing and organisation software for Windows
- AlbumPlus: Image organizer software for Windows
- Scan, Stitch, and Share: Document mosaicing software for Windows
- FontManager: Font management software for Windows
- PopArtPlus: Image colour grading software for Windows
- MontagePlus: Photomontage creation software for Windows
