= Digital scrapbooking =

Digital scrapbooking is the term for the creation of a new 2D artwork by re-combining various graphic elements. It is a form of scrapbooking that is done using a personal computer, digital or scanned photos and computer graphics software. It is a relatively new form of the traditional print scrapbooking.

Recent advances in technology now enable the craft to be pursued on tablets and smart devices utilising imaging apps as well as hobby specific apps, some of which have been created specifically by brands for use with their own image products.

Digital scrapbooking kits are available to purchase and download at many websites that specialize in the craft. Kits contain graphics and word-art and are usually themed and color-coordinated. They usually consist of a mix of background images and "cut out" [extracted] images containing alpha channels. Once a kit has been downloaded to the computer or device, it can then be used over and over again to make new scrapbook pages (scrapbook layouts) within the software program that one chooses to use, often in combination with the users's own family photographs, scanned keepsakes and other unique personal elements scanned on a flatbed scanner. Scanning is usually done at 300dpi, to make the resulting images suitable for print.

== Licensing and Copyright ==
Kits are sometimes licensed differently from other forms of traditional royalty-free stock images that may be purchased per-item or in sets at online stock photography sites. Some kit packs will be wholly royalty-free, but some kit makers may restrict usage to non-commercial work only. Some may specifically forbid the use of their work in projects for commercial gain, for example greetings cards and gift tags that may be made with their kits. Licensing often varies from kit to kit, even from the same maker. Some kits include derivative works of public domain material.

In contrast to stock, creators of digital scrapbooking kits often require a credit or byline to indicate that their image elements have been used in a new creation.

== Uses ==
Some artistic individuals combine digital scrapbooking with traditional scrapbooking to create what's known as hybrid scrapbooking projects. Hybrid scrapbooking involves creating layouts on the computer using digital supplies that will then be printed and combined with traditional supplies such as buttons, ribbons and other elements. Conversely, a hybrid scrapbook project may also be created using traditional paper supplies and augmented with digital elements that have been printed and cut out specifically for use on the project.

Journaling may be done within the software programs to accompany images and to create digital storybooks, or scrapbooks, which are then published in photo books via various popular print-on-demand services, printed and added to traditional scrapbooks, burned to CDs or posted on the Web.

Digital Scrapbooking may also be done online by uploading photos to a specialist scrapbooking website and utilising their custom built platforms and decorative image elements to complete the projects for print to finished products, for example photo books and holiday greeting cards.

== Market Size ==
The traditional scrapbooking market appeared to decline somewhat in the USA since 2010, probably due to the 2008 financial crisis, and the digital scrapbooking market (being potentially a much cheaper form of scrapbooking) may have increased accordingly. Both markets currently appear to have recovered lost ground and expanded since the beginning of the COVID-19 pandemic as many people sought to productively fill their time during lockdowns, quarantines and self-isolation / stay at home directions.

== Digital scrapbooking software ==
The main software programs that are typically used are Adobe Photoshop, Adobe Photoshop Elements, paint.net (freeware), Filter Forge, Corel Paintshop Pro, and GIMP. Additionally Adobe offer the Photoshop iOS product using the same code base as the desktop version to drive the app version.

== Digital scrapbooking supplies ==
Digital scrapbooking supplies are downloaded from the Internet and then stored on a computer or external hardrive, DVD or CD media, SD cards, or in the cloud, to be used as needed.

Both paid and free digital scrapbooking supplies available from numerous designers on their blogs or in e-commerce stores either as solo designers or as part of a wide cohort of designers working cooperatively in large full service e-commerce websites.

Usually designed at 300ppi image resolution, digital scrapbooking product offerings and supplies often include:

- Full coordinated kits containing digital background “papers”, decorative alphabets, and diverse embellishments generally containing a mixture of .JPG and .PNG files;
- "Quick pages", flattened files containing a completed page layout with transparent photo windows in .PNG file format;
- Digital templates, fully layered layouts i.e. pages that have had the composition pre-designed ready for use in an imaging program or app, fully customizable for color schemes, kit choices, photographs and other embellishments, generally supplied in either .PSD or .TIF file format;
- Hybrid “quick pages”, i.e. layouts that are both fully designed and fully layered for customization, generally supplied in either .PSD or .TIF file format;
- Adobe Photoshop actions, brushes, custom shapes, paths and styles, saved in their respective native Photoshop file formats; and
- Corel PaintShop Pro equivalent tools.
