= WebPlus =

Website design program

- Developer: Serif
- Release: 2000; 26 years ago
- Stable release: X8 / 17 November 2014; 11 years ago
- Written in: C++
- Operating system: Microsoft Windows
- Type: Web design
- License: Proprietary
- Website: www.serif.com

Serif WebPlus was a website design program for Microsoft Windows, developed by the software company, Serif. It allows users to design, create and upload their website onto the internet without any knowledge of HTML or other web technologies.

Much like Microsoft Word, WebPlus uses WYSIWYG drag and drop editing to add and position text, images and links as they would appear on the finished web page. Once a user has designed their site, WebPlus can preview the site in a web browser before uploading the site using the in-built FTP.

The software comes with a variety of pre-designed sample websites containing Filler text like Lorem ipsum, which can be used as a template for quickly designing a site. It also provides drawing tools for creating and editing buttons and web graphics.

== Free WebPlus Starter Edition ==
Previously Serif had made available feature limited Starter Editions of their software, based on older versions, which could be obtained and used free of charge. For WebPlus the final free edition was based on version X5 and this was released in September 2012. This continued to be available from Serif's server until it was withdrawn around March 2016. WebPlus was then only available as a paid-for version X8.

== Program Withdrawal ==
In March 2016, Serif announced that WebPlus X8 would be the final version, and that there were no current plans to design an application to replace it. Sales of WebPlus X8 by Serif were ended around December 2016.

In early 2018, Serif announced that Serif Web Resources, hosted on Serif servers and required to implement some advanced web-site functionality in WebPlus created sites, would no longer work after 31 August 2018.

In 2018, Serif also shutdown the servers that generated the "Plus" software registration numbers on-line from the product version and the individual generated installation number. Serif revealed the alternative was to use a universal master registration number, which is 881887. This is known to work with post 2003 Serif "Plus" software (e.g. verified to work with PagePlus v5.02). However, later Serif "Plus" software still registers itself automatically if within a certain recent period of a previous Serif software registration on the same PC.

== Supported platforms ==
WebPlus was developed for Microsoft Windows "Win32" graphical desktop interface and is fully compatible with Windows XP, Windows Vista (32/64bit), Windows 7 (32/64bit) and Windows 8.

== Features ==
- Web hosting to upload websites to the internet with the address www.sitename.webplus.net and email sitename@webplus.net.
- E-Commerce tool to create online stores with providers such as PayPal.
- Form wizard generates online forms to collect information from website visitors.
- Add blogs, forums, hit counters, online polls and content management systems to websites using Smart Objects.
- Google Maps tool embeds maps and optional navigation markers within a website.
- Site navigation bars adopt a website's structure providing a tool for navigating around the website.
- Photo gallery groups a collection of images together and displays them as an animated slideshow.
- Search engine optimization (SEO) tools optimise a websites search ranking with the likes of Google, Yahoo! and Bing.
- Collect website metrics such as page popularity and number of website hits using Google Analytics.
- WebPlus X5 introduced a button studio for creating button graphics.
- Restrict access to specific pages on a website with a secure member's area.
- WebPlus automatically converts images and graphics into a web targeted format, optimising them for fast download.
- Embed YouTube videos within a web page.
- Add animated effects to a website with Animated GIFs, Animated Marquees or by importing Flash videos.
- Stream news and information feeds to a website using RSS and podcasts.
- Automated Site Checker analyses and corrects potential problems with a website.
- AdSense tool incorporates Google AdSense advertisements into a website
- In-built FTP transfers files onto a web server, uploading a website to the internet.
- In-built Basic Photo Editor the PhotoLab can make automatic adjustments and "Quick Fix's" to photos.
- From X5, WebPlus offers image editing and filters, through its PhotoLab and also provides a dedicated background-removal tool in the form of Cutout Studio.
- Display images, Flash videos and web pages using animated Lightboxes.
- Filter Effects can be applied to the graphical objects, giving convincing, realistic effects such as glass, metallic, plastic and other 2D/3D filters.
- WebPlus also provides QuickShapes for creating button and web graphics. These predefined shapes can be quickly modified with sliders to adjust certain parameters, for example creating rounded rectangles, etc. Shapes include: rectangles, ellipses, stars, spirals, cogs, petals, etc.

== Bibliography ==
- WebPlus X8 official user guide
