= Affinity (software) =

Graphics editor from Canva Pty Ltd

- Affinity 3.0.0 running on Windows 11
- Developers: Serif Europe; Canva
- Stable release: 3.3.3.5004 / 2 November 2026; 14 days ago
- Operating system: macOS, Microsoft Windows, iPadOS
- Available in: 9 languages
- List of languages English, German, Spanish, French, Italian, Portuguese, Japanese, Chinese, Russian
- Type: Graphics editor
- License: Proprietary
- Website: affinity.studio

Affinity is a graphics editor developed by Serif, a subsidiary of Canva. It is simultaneously a vector graphics editor, a raster graphics editor and a page layout application.

It was first released in 2025 as a successor to Serif's Affinity Designer, Affinity Photo and Affinity Publisher, uniting the three editors into one application. While the previous versions competed individually against Adobe's Illustrator, Photoshop, and InDesign, Affinity 3.0 integrates their functionality into a single application. It uses a freemium model monetised by AI features exclusive to Canva Pro subscribers.

== Functionality ==
Affinity is divided into studios that can be switched between at will: including Vector, Pixel and Layout.

Affinity is divided into a number of workspaces ("studios"), which are equivalent to the previous suite of Affinity applications: "vector" for vector graphics (Designer), "pixel" for raster editing (Photo), and "layout" for desktop publishing (Publisher). Additionally, it introduces the ability to create custom workspaces.

The application supports real-time previews and non-destructive editing, which are based on GPU acceleration. Supported file formats include Adobe Photoshop, InDesign and Illustrator files, PDF, SVG, and TIFF, as well as a custom .af file format.

=== Raster editing ===
Affinity includes photo editing tools including adjustments, masks, blend modes, batch processing, and retouching facilities. Additionally, the application can develop RAW files, similar to Adobe Lightroom.

=== Page layout ===
Publishing features include master pages, text styles, and advanced typography.

=== AI features ===
The application supports Canva's existing AI features, such as background removal and generative fill. This requires a Canva subscription.

== Development ==
=== Background and acquisition (2014–2024) ===
Serif launched the original Affinity suite starting with Affinity Designer in 2014, followed by Photo (2015) and Publisher (2019). The software gained popularity for its one-time purchase model, contrasting with Adobe's subscription-based Creative Cloud. In November 2022, Serif released Version 2 of the suite, introducing a "Universal License" that covered all three apps across all platforms. In March 2024, Canva acquired Serif for approximately A$580 million (£300 million). Following user backlash regarding a potential shift to subscriptions, Canva and Serif issued a joint "Pledge" committing to four key principles: fair pricing, no mandatory subscriptions, perpetual licenses for existing products, and continued development of Affinity as a standalone suite.

=== Unified release (2025) ===
In September 2025, Serif pulled all existing versions of Affinity Designer, Affinity Photo and Affinity Publisher from sale ahead an upcoming announcement on 30 October; also ahead of the announcement, the iPadOS versions of the Affinity suite became free on App Store. During a "Creative Freedom" keynote on 30 October 2025, Canva released a new version now simply branded as "Affinity" (also known as "Affinity by Canva"), and referred to internally as version 3.0. Version 3 drops the separate applications and integrates their functionality into a singular application, and adds the ability to export directly to the Canva platform. It also adds a Canva AI studio, including background removal, "Expand & Edit", and generative fill.

As of version 3, Affinity has switched to a freemium model; it is now available at no charge to users, although access to Canva AI features are locked behind the existing Canva Pro subscription service. Serif stated that the perpetually-licensed version 2 will remain available to existing owners, although it will no longer be actively maintained. The new version is currently available for macOS, Windows and iPadOS, with a Linux version to be released in the future.

== Reception ==
The change in business model by Canva in 2025 was met with mixed reception, including concerns about its incorporation of AI features. Some users were concerned that their projects would be used for machine learning purposes, or that future versions would suffer from a lack of maintenance or become adware. Additionally, some felt it turned Affinity into fundamentally subscription-based software, given the prevalence of these features in professional contexts.

Affinity publicly stated on social media that it would remain "free forever", users' projects would not be used to train AI models, and that "Canva has built a sustainable business model that allows this kind of generosity. And when more professionals use Affinity, Canva can sell more seats into businesses."

== See also ==
- Comparison of desktop publishing software
- Comparison of raster graphics editors
- Comparison of vector graphics editors
- List of 2D graphics software
