= Black point compensation =

Black point compensation is a technique used in digital photography printing. It is a method of creating adjustments between the maximum black levels of digital files and the black capabilities of various digital devices.
