= Affinity Designer =

Vector graphics editor

- Affinity Designer 2.6.5 running on Windows 11
- Developer: Serif Europe
- Release: 2 October 2014; 12 years ago
- Final release: 2.6.5 / 22 September 2025; 13 months ago
- Operating system: macOS, Microsoft Windows, iPadOS
- Available in: 9 languages
- List of languages English, German, Spanish, French, Italian, Portuguese, Japanese, Chinese, Russian
- Type: Vector graphics editor
- License: Proprietary
- Website: https://affinity.serif.com/designer (British English) at the Wayback Machine (archived April 25, 2025); Original

Affinity Designer is a discontinued vector graphics editor developed by Serif for macOS, Microsoft Windows and iPadOS.

Developed as a successor to Serif's DrawPlus and first released in 2014, Affinity Designer was part of a suite alongside Affinity Photo and Affinity Publisher, respectively a raster graphics editor and desktop publishing application.

Affinity used a perpetual license model. In 2025, following the purchase of Serif by Canva in 2024, it was replaced by the freemium Affinity application, bundling vector, raster and layout features together.

== Functionality ==
Affinity Designer serves as a successor to Serif's own DrawPlus software, which the company discontinued in August 2017 in order to focus on the Affinity product range. It has been described as an Adobe Illustrator alternative, and is compatible with common graphics file formats, including Adobe Illustrator (AI), Scalable Vector Graphics (SVG), Adobe Photoshop (PSD), Portable Document Format (PDF), and Encapsulated PostScript (EPS) formats. The application can also import data from some Adobe FreeHand files (specifically versions 10 and MX).

Affinity Designer's core functions include vector pen and shape-drawing tools, support for custom vector and raster brushes (including the ability to import Adobe Photoshop (ABR) brushes), dynamic symbols, stroke stabilization, text style management, and vector/pixel export options.

Affinity Designer provides non-destructive editing features across unlimited layers, with pan and zoom at 60fps, and real-time views for effects and transformations. It supports the RGB, RGB Hex, LAB, CMYK and Grayscale color models, along with PANTONE color swatches and an end-to-end CMYK workflow with ICC color management, and 16-bit per channel editing.

== Development ==
Affinity Designer icon history

v1 icon

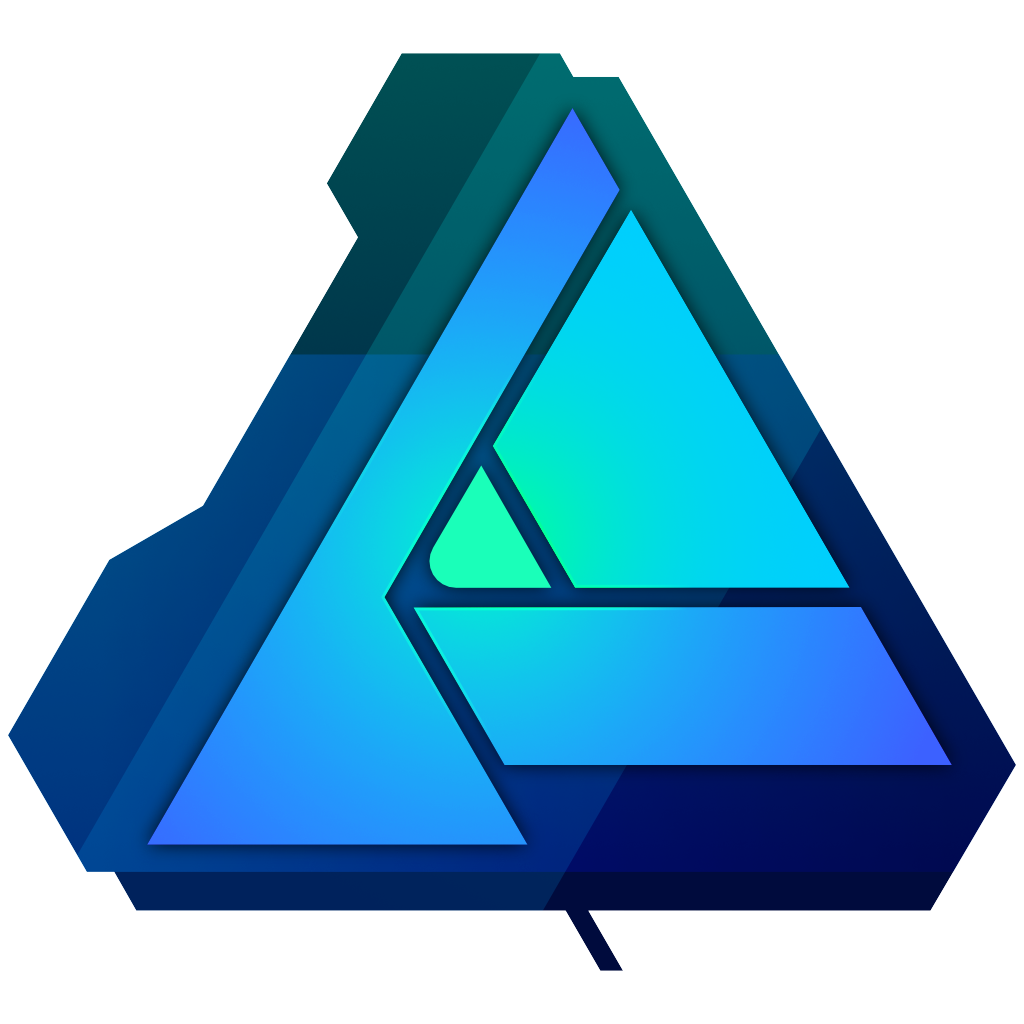
2015 icon

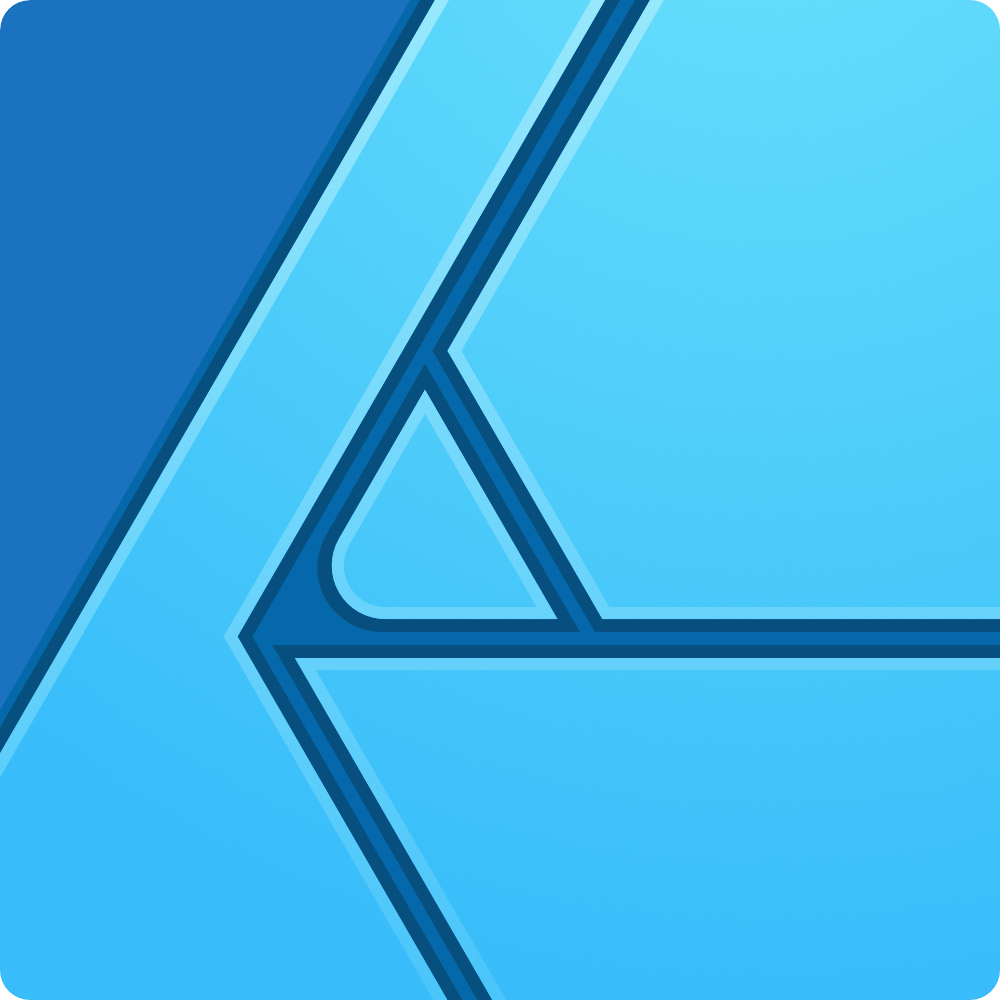
2019 icon

v2 icon

=== Release ===
The first version was released in October 2014, making it the first of the Affinity apps to be released by Serif (and their first macOS release). At that time, Serif's vector graphics application for Windows was DrawPlus; however, following the release of Affinity Designer for Windows, this product has now been discontinued.

Affinity Designer began as a vector graphics editor solely for macOS. It was developed entirely from scratch for this operating system, allowing it to leverage core native technologies such as OpenGL, Grand Central Dispatch, and Core Graphics.

Version 1.2, released in April 2015, introduced new tools and features, such as a corner tool and a pixel-alignment mode for GUI design tasks. In December 2015, version 1.4 then introduced new features for managing artboards and printing. With version 1.5 in October 2016, the application received multiple new features, including symbols, constraints, asset management and text styles.

The application began branching out to other platforms in November 2016, when it first launched for Microsoft Windows.

Version 1.6 was released in November 2017, introducing performance improvements and alternative GUI display mode.

The first release of a separate iPad version of Affinity Designer took place in July 2018.

Version 1.7 was released in June 2019 adding some key features such as HDR support, unlimited strokes and fills to a single shape, new point transform tool, new transform mode in Node tool, Lasso selection of nodes, new sculpt mode added to pencil, and also some big performance improvements. Version 1.8, released in February 2020, added the ability for users to define their own document templates and keyboard shortcuts, and a built-in panel for adding stock images. Version 1.9 was released in February 2021, containing "substantial performance gains when working with complex vector documents" and hardware acceleration for Windows.

=== Version 2 ===
In November 2022, Serif launched the second major version of Affinity Designer, incorporating shape builder and knife tools, vector warping, and an x-ray view. However, it received criticism online as some users felt the new feature set was not substantial enough to justify a new purchase. This was followed by version 2.1 in May 2023 and version 2.2 in September 2023, adding various UI improvements and support for macOS Sonoma.

=== Version 3 and merge into Affinity ===
Icon for the combined Affinity v3

In October 2025, Affinity Designer was discontinued in favour of the freemium Affinity by Canva, which has unified the functionality of the three separate Affinity applications.

== Reception ==
Affinity Designer was selected as a runner-up in Apple's "Best of 2014" list of Mac App Store and iTunes Store content in the macOS app category. It also was one of the winners of the 2015 Apple Design Award.

In 2018, the Windows version of Affinity Designer won 'Application Creator of the Year' at the Windows Developer Awards (part of Microsoft Build 2018).

Affinity Designer was selected as the winner of the "Best Software For Designers" Award in the 2022 Creative Bloq Awards.

== See also ==
- Comparison of vector graphics editors
