= Şərif =

Village in Balakan Rayon, Azerbaijan

Coordinates: 41°44′N 46°15′E

Şərif is a village and municipality in the Balakan Rayon of Azerbaijan. It has a population of 3,231.
