= Affinity Photo =

Photo editing app

- Affinity Photo 2.6.5 running on Windows 11
- Developer: Serif
- Release: 9 July 2015; 11 years ago
- Final release: 2.6.5 / 27 October 2025; 12 months ago
- Operating system: iPadOS, macOS, Windows
- Size: 994 MB (iPadOS); 2.85 GB (macOS); 866 MB (Windows)
- Available in: English, German, French, Spanish, Portuguese, Japanese, Italian, Chinese
- Type: Raster graphics editor
- License: Proprietary
- Website: affinity.serif.com/photo/

Affinity Photo is a discontinued raster graphics editor developed by Serif for macOS, Microsoft Windows and iPadOS.

Developed as a successor to Serif's PhotoPlus and first released in 2015, Affinity Photo was part of a suite alongside Affinity Designer and Affinity Publisher, respectively a vector graphics editor and a desktop publishing application.

Affinity used a perpetual license model. In 2025, following the purchase of Serif by Canva in 2024, it was replaced by the freemium Affinity application, bundling raster, vector and layout features together. As of August 2026, Affinity Photo is still on the iPad App Store due to the fact that Affinity has not been released for iPad.

== Functionality ==
Affinity Photo has been described as an Adobe Photoshop alternative, and is compatible with common file formats such as Adobe's PSD (including Photoshop smart objects). Functionality includes RAW processing, colour space options, live preview of effects, image stitching, alpha compositing, black point compensation, and optical aberration corrections. Working in Affinity Photo is always live, with pan and zoom at 60 fps and non-destructive editing. It supports unlimited layers and a dedicated workspace for developing RAW photos; as well as RGB, CMYK, LAB, Greyscale colourspaces with ICC colour management and 16-bit per channel editing.

Affinity Photo is not an image organiser like Apple Aperture or Adobe Lightroom.

== Development ==
Affinity Photo icon history

Beta icon

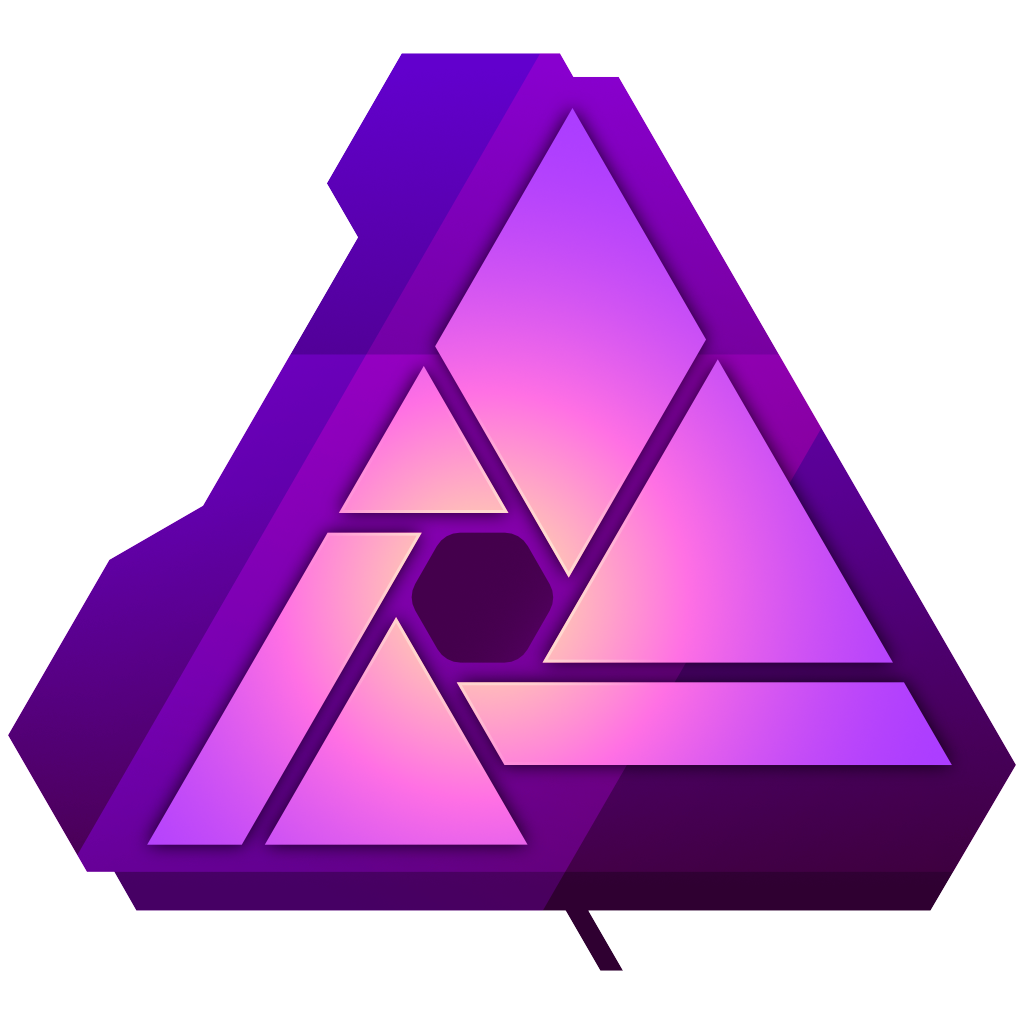
v1 icon

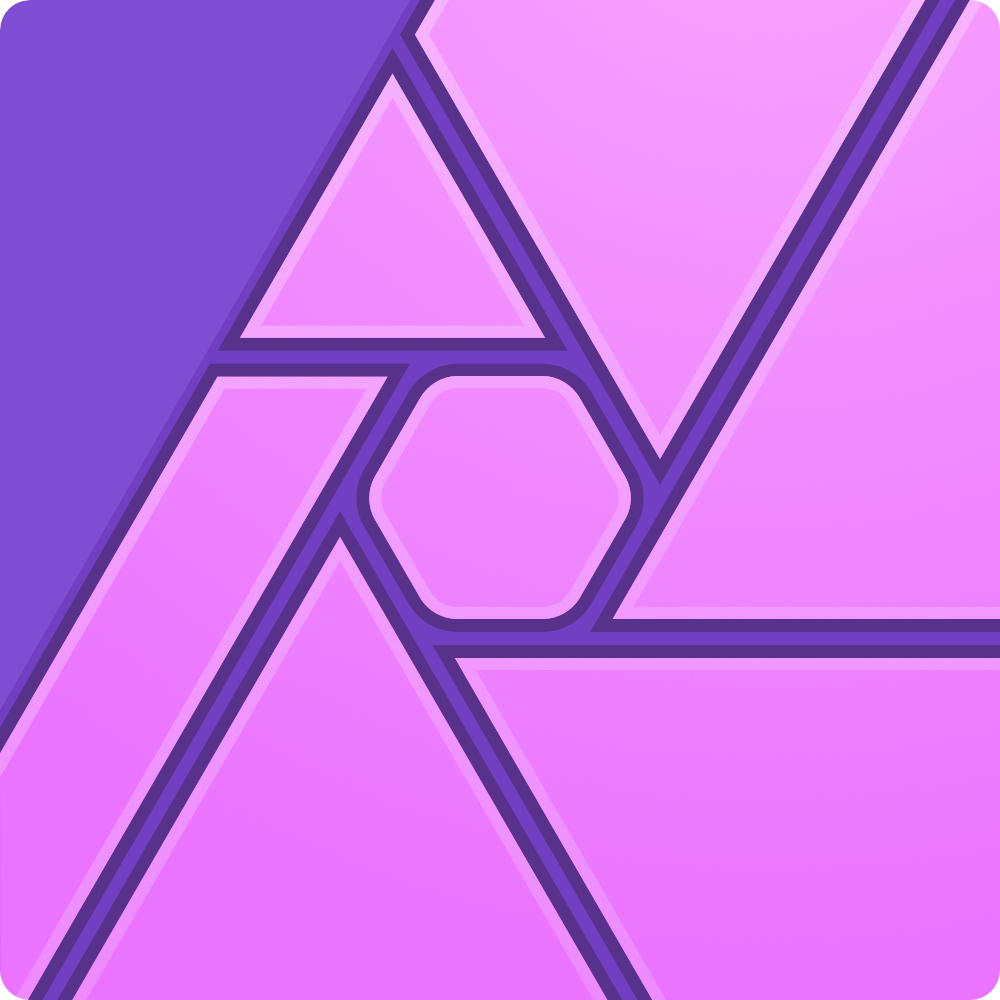
2019 icon

v2 icon

=== Release ===
Affinity Photo began as a raster graphics editor solely for macOS. It was Serif's second macOS app after Affinity Designer and was similarly built from the ground up to leverage core native technologies, including Grand Central Dispatch, Core Graphics, OpenGL and Metal 2 hardware acceleration.

Serif established an R&D team for Affinity Photo in 2009, headed by lead designer Andy Somerfield. A free beta test version was released to the public on 9 February 2015. The initial stable release of Affinity Photo, version 1.3.1, launched on the Mac App Store on 9 July 2015 for macOS 10.7 and later. In August, version 1.3.5 was released providing numerous bug fixes and improvements. Version 1.4, in December 2015, added panorama photo stitching, support for macOS 10.11 El Capitan including six Affinity extensions for Apple Photos, and augmented the languages supported in previous versions (English (US and UK), German, French and Spanish) with Italian, Portuguese (Brazilian), and Japanese. Versions 1.4.1 and 1.4.2 in January and June 2016 provided stability and bug fixes, and the app was optimised for macOS 10.12 Sierra with version 1.4.3 in September 2016.

In December, 2016, Serif launched Affinity Photo for Windows and released version 1.5.1 for macOS at the same time, adding a 32-bit RGB editing mode with support for 32-bit file formats and more than 70 new camera RAW file formats, as well as the ability to develop RAW files directly into a 32-bit document. It also added support for the new MacBook Pro with Touchbar.

Affinity Photo for iPad was launched during the keynote at Apple's WWDC in San Jose on 5 June 2017. In September 2017, the iPad version was updated for compatibility with Apple's new iOS 11. Major updates to Affinity Photo and Affinity Designer were released in November 2017. Affinity Photo 1.6.6 was optimised for macOS 10.13 High Sierra (and Metal 2 acceleration), better integration with Apple Photos, improved Photoshop Plugins support, and added an option to switch between a dark or light user interface. Serif discontinued PhotoPlus in 2017.

In February 2020, version 1.8 added support for Photoshop smart objects in PSD files, and expanded plug-in compatibility, with focus on DxO's Nik Collection of plug-ins. Version 1.9 was released in February 2021, containing performance improvements.

=== Version 2 ===
In November 2022, Serif launched the second major version of the Affinity suite. For Photo, it included JPEG XL capabilities, live warping, and non-destructive RAW editing. However, it received criticism online as some users felt the new feature set was not substantial enough to justify a new purchase. This was followed by version 2.1 in May 2023 and version 2.2 in September 2023, adding various UI improvements and support for macOS Sonoma. In version 2.4, support for 32-bit HDR PNGs and more camera models was added.

=== Version 3 and merge into Affinity ===
Icon for the combined Affinity v3

In October 2025, Affinity Photo was discontinued in favour of the freemium Affinity by Canva, which has unified the functionality of the three separate Affinity applications.

== Reception ==
The macOS version of Affinity Photo was received favourably by professional photographers, and Apple named it as the best Mac app of 2015. In 2016, Affinity Photo was awarded the prize for Best Imaging Software by the Technical Image Press Association (TIPA) at Photokina. In November 2017, the iPadOS app was named by Apple as its best iPad app of the year, and Tom's Guide selected Affinity Photo for their first list of Best Tech Values. In February 2019, Affinity Photo received Amateur Photographer's Software of the Year award, followed by Photography News’ Best Software award in March 2019. In 2023, Amateur Photographer presented another award to Affinity Photo for the Photo Editing Software of the Year award.

== See also ==
- Comparison of raster graphics editors
