= Serif PhotoPlus =

Raster graphics editor

PhotoPlus

- PhotoPlus version X8
- Developer: Serif
- Initial release: 1999; 27 years ago
- Final release: X8 / August 10, 2015; 10 years ago
- Written in: C++
- Operating system: Microsoft Windows
- Successor: Affinity Photo
- Type: Raster graphics editor
- License: Proprietary
- Website: www.serif.com/en-gb/legacy/downloads/

Serif PhotoPlus is an image editing program for Microsoft Windows. The latest version is Serif PhotoPlus X8. Serif currently refers to this package as part of their Legacy range (following its replacement by their Affinity Photo product), meaning that no future updates will be released.

Users who need to recover legacy image data in file formats such as the proprietary .SPP Serif PhotoPlus Picture file format; Serif PhotoPlus Starter Edition for Windows downloads can still be found on websites such as Softonic, CNET Download and other sites.

However, following installation, it is required to register the app with an install key or register either by telephone or online - unfortunately neither registration service is functional. Fortunately, Serif Europe was kind enough to release a Universal Registration Key (881887) in a blog post dated June 27, 2022. After installing and using the above Universal Registration Key, proprietary image formats, such as .SPP, can then be exported to popular image formats such as .jpg, .gif, .png, etc..

== History ==
- PhotoPlus 5: 1999.
- PhotoPlus 6: 1999.
- PhotoPlus 7: 2001.
- PhotoPlus 8: 2002.
- PhotoPlus 9: 2003.
- PhotoPlus 10: 2005.
- PhotoPlus 11: 25 September 2006.
- PhotoPlus X2: 29 October 2007.
- PhotoPlus X3: 11 May 2009.
- PhotoPlus X4: 12 July 2010.
- PhotoPlus X5: 12 September 2011.
- PhotoPlus X6: 3 December 2012.
- PhotoPlus X7: 28 April 2014.
- PhotoPlus X8: 10 August 2015.

== See also ==
- Comparison of raster graphics editors
- Raster graphics editor
- Image editing
- Photo manipulation
