= Gaorong Ventures =

China-based venture capital firm

- Native name: 高榕创投
- Formerly: Banyan Capital; Gaorong Capital
- Company type: Private
- Industry: Venture Capital
- Founded: January 2014; 12 years ago
- Founders: Zhang Zhen; Gao Xiang; Yue Bin
- Headquarters: Beijing, China
- Products: Investments
- AUM: US$4 billion (2020)
- Website: gaorongvc.com

Gaorong Ventures (Gaorong; Chinese: 高榕创投; pinyin: Gāoróng Chuàngtóu) is a Beijing-based venture capital firm founded in 2014. The firm focuses on investments related to Technology, Media and Telecommunications (TMT).

== Background ==
In January 2014, three former IDG Capital employees founded Banyan Capital. They focused on TMT investments during their time at IDG and wanted to set up a sub-fund within IDG but were opposed by the firm. Despite leaving IDG, the team left on good terms and IDG would be investors in the firm's funds later on. The firm's name was taken from the fact that a banyan tree is that it can form a forest with a single tree. This represented the relationship between the firm and the companies it invests in.

The team encountered difficulties at the start where they needed to work in the lobbies of hotels to meet multiple investors since at the time, the firm did not have an office.

The team had chosen to raise money in the fourth quarter of 2013 which was before larger financial institutions had started. When 2014 arrived, the firm was able to quickly raise capital. The firm's first fund that had an initial target of US$150 million was oversubscribed after only two-month with over 40 investors attracted and raised a total of US$206 million. The firm became known for its fast growth during a short period. It was the first one in China to look for entrepreneurs to become investors in its funds as they offered not just financial support but industry experience and resources. When selecting companies to invest in, it would select ones that were able to compliment each other so it became more of building an ecosystem.

In 2018, the firm changed its name to Gaorong Capital to achieve more consistent brand recognition with Chinese entrepreneurs.

The main investors of Gaorong include entrepreneurs, family offices, fund-of-funds, foundations and other institutional investors such as Tencent, Alibaba and Xiaomi.

Notable companies that Gaorong has invested in include Xiaomi, Meituan and Pinduoduo.
