= Canva =

Australian multinational proprietary software company

Canva Pty Ltd
- Type: Private
- Industry: Graphic design; Software; Artificial intelligence
- Founded: 1 January 2013; 13 years ago
- Founders: Melanie Perkins; Cliff Obrecht; Cameron Adams
- Headquarters: Sydney, Australia
- Area served: Worldwide
- Key people: Melanie Perkins (CEO)
- Products: Canva; Affinity
- Members: More than 265 million monthly active users (2025)
- Number of employees: 5,500 (2024)
- Subsidiaries: Pixabay; Pexels; Serif; Kaleido; Leonardo.ai; Smartmockups; Flourish; Cavalry; MangoAI; Simtheory; Ortto
- Website: canva.com

Canva
- Developers: Canva, Inc.
- Release: August 2013; 13 years ago
- Operating system: Web application, Android, iOS, macOS, Windows
- Available in: 100 languages
- List of languages Afrikaans, Albanian, Arabic, Armenian, Assamese, Azerbaijani, Basque, Bengali, Bulgarian, Burmese, Catalan, Cebuano, Croatian, Czech, Danish, Dutch, English, Estonian, Finnish, French, Fulani, Galician, Georgian, German, Greek, Gujarati, Hausa, Hebrew, Hindi, Hungarian, Igbo, Indonesian, Italian, Japanese, Javanese, Kannada, Kazak, Khmer, Korean, Kurdish, Kyrgyz, Latvian, Lithuanian, Macedonian, Maithili, Malay, Malayalam, Marathi, Mongolian, Nepali, Norwegian, Oromo, Persian, Polish, Portuguese, Punjabi, Romanian, Russian, Serbian, Shona, Simplified Chinese, Sindhi, Sinhala, Slovak, Slovenian, Somali, Spanish, Strayan, Sundanese, Swahili, Swedish, Tagalog, Tamil, Telugu, Thai, Traditional Chinese, Turkish, Ukrainian, Urdu, Uzbek, Vietnamese, Welsh, Wolof, Xhosa, Yoruba and Zulu
- Type: Graphics software, Whiteboarding
- License: SaaS
- Website: canva.com

Canva Pty Ltd is an Australian multinational software company launched in 2013. The platform provides a graphic design platform to create visual content for presentations, websites, and other digital products. Its uses include templates for presentations, posters, and social media content, as well as photo and video editing functionality.

The platform uses a drag-and-drop interface designed for its users without professional design training or experience. Canva operates on a freemium model and has added features such as print services and video editing tools over time.

== History ==
=== 2012–2020 ===
Canva was founded in Perth, Australia, by Melanie Perkins, Cliff Obrecht and Cameron Adams on 1 January 2013. One of the company's early investors was Susan Wu, an American entrepreneur. In its first year, Canva had more than 750,000 users. In 2017, the company reached profitability and had 294,000 paying customers.

In January 2018, Perkins announced that the company had raised A$40 million from Sequoia Capital, Blackbird Ventures, and Felicis Ventures, and was valued at A$1 billion. It raised A$70 million in May 2019 and A$85 million in October 2019, when Canva for Enterprise launched.

In December 2019, Canva announced Canva for Education, a free product for educational institutions intended to facilitate collaboration between students and teachers.

In 2020, Canva announced a partnership with FedEx Office in June and with Office Depot in July.

=== 2021–2025 ===
In September 2021, Canva raised US$200 million, with its value peaking that year at US$40 billion. By September 2022, its valuation had levelled at US$26 billion.

While Canva's value declined from its 2021 peak by mid-2022, it remained one of Australia's most prominent technology companies, alongside Atlassian. In 2023, the pair were named in the Australian Financial Review's AFR Rich List as among the 10 most wealthy people in Australia.

On 7 December 2022, Canva launched Magic Write, the platform's AI-powered copywriting assistant. On 22 March 2023, it announced its Assistant tool, which makes recommendations on graphics and styles that match the user's existing design. On 11 January 2024, Canva launched its own GPT in OpenAI's GPT Store.

In May 2024, the company announced the launch of Canva Enterprise, a plan designed for large organisations, alongside tools including Work Kits, Courses and AI capabilities. In 2024, it announced a co-funded solar energy project to enhance its sustainability efforts.

In February 2023, Canva reorganised its corporate group. A newly incorporated Delaware company, Canva, Inc., became the group's ultimate holding company. The former parent was subsequently registered in Australia as Canva Australia Holdings Pty Ltd, while the group's business operations were intended to continue in substantially the same manner.

On 10 April 2025, Canva released Visual Suite 2. The interface combines Canva's design and productivity tools. Features include a spreadsheets application (Canva Sheets), a generative AI coding assistant (Canva Code), a chatbot, and an updated photo editor that can modify or remove background objects.

In August 2025, Canva launched a stock sale to employees, valuing the company at US$42 billion.

In October 2025, Canva introduced a design model capable of generating layouts with separately editable layers and objects. It also relaunched Affinity as a unified application combining vector, pixel and page-layout tools and made the base application free to use.

By the end of 2025, Canva reported more than 265 million monthly active users and more than 31 million paid users. Its annual recurring revenue reached US$4 billion, including US$500 million from business customers with more than 25 seats.

=== 2026-present ===
In April 2026, Canva introduced Canva AI 2.0 in research preview, adding agentic tools that can schedule and perform recurring design tasks in the background. The company also added an offline mode that allows selected designs to be edited without an internet connection and synchronised when connectivity returns.

In August 2026, Canva reduced its expected annual revenue-growth rate from 30% to 20%. The company said unexpectedly high costs associated with serving its AI features had led it to slow their rollout while rebuilding the underlying architecture. Chief executive Melanie Perkins said that the cost per AI task had fallen by nearly 90% since Canva AI 2.0 was introduced in April.

In November 2026 1,271 people, or 22% of the workforce, were laid off. This was announced to the company's Slack by Melanie Perkins. Affected employees received at least six months’ salary, alongside career support, and continued healthcare benefits where available. Canva also offered $10,000 grants to departing staff who want to launch businesses or community projects.

== Acquisitions ==
In 2018, Canva acquired presentations startup Zeetings for an undisclosed amount, as part of its expansion into the presentations space.

In May 2019, Canva announced the acquisitions of Pixabay and Pexels, two free stock photography sites based in Germany, which enabled Canva users to access their photos for designs.

In February 2021, Canva acquired Austrian startup Kaleido.ai and the Czech-based Smartmockups.

In 2022, Canva acquired Flourish, a London-based data visualization startup.

In March 2024, Canva acquired UK-based Serif, the developers of the Affinity suite of graphic design software, for approximately $380 million.

In August 2024, Canva acquired the AI image generation platform and startup, Leonardo AI, for an undisclosed amount.

In June 2025, it was announced that Canva had acquired Australian AI marketing startup MagicBrief for an undisclosed amount.

In February 2026, Canva acquired two startups: Cavalry, which specializes in animation software, and MangoAI, which aims to optimize advertising performance.

In April 2026, Canva acquired Simtheory, an AI Workflow Tool, and Ortto, a marketing automation tool.

== Philanthropy ==
Canva's co-founders, Melanie Perkins and Cliff Obrecht, have said they intend to donate a significant part of their personal wealth to charity.

In 2021, Canva started a partnership with GiveDirectly, a nonprofit organization operating in low-income areas that makes unconditional cash transfers to families living in extreme poverty. Since then, the company has donated $50 million to support GiveDirectly's work across Malawi.

In 2025, Canva announced an additional $100 million commitment to expand its GiveDirectly partnership.

== 2019 data breach ==
A May 2019 data breach exposed roughly 139 million Canva users' data. The exposed data included real names of users, usernames, email addresses, geographical information, and password hashes.

In January 2020, about 4 million Canva user passwords were decrypted and shared online. Canva responded by resetting the passwords of every user who had not changed their password since the initial breach.

== See also ==
- Adobe — American multinational software company
- Figma — Online collaborative vector graphics editor
- Comparison of desktop publishing software
