= Erin Smith =

Erin Smith may refer to:

- Erin Smith (musician)
- Erin Smith (entrepreneur)
- Erin Smith (bowls)
- Erin Elizabeth Smith, American poet, editor, publisher, and educator
