= Lucy Guo =

American serial entrepreneur (born 1994)

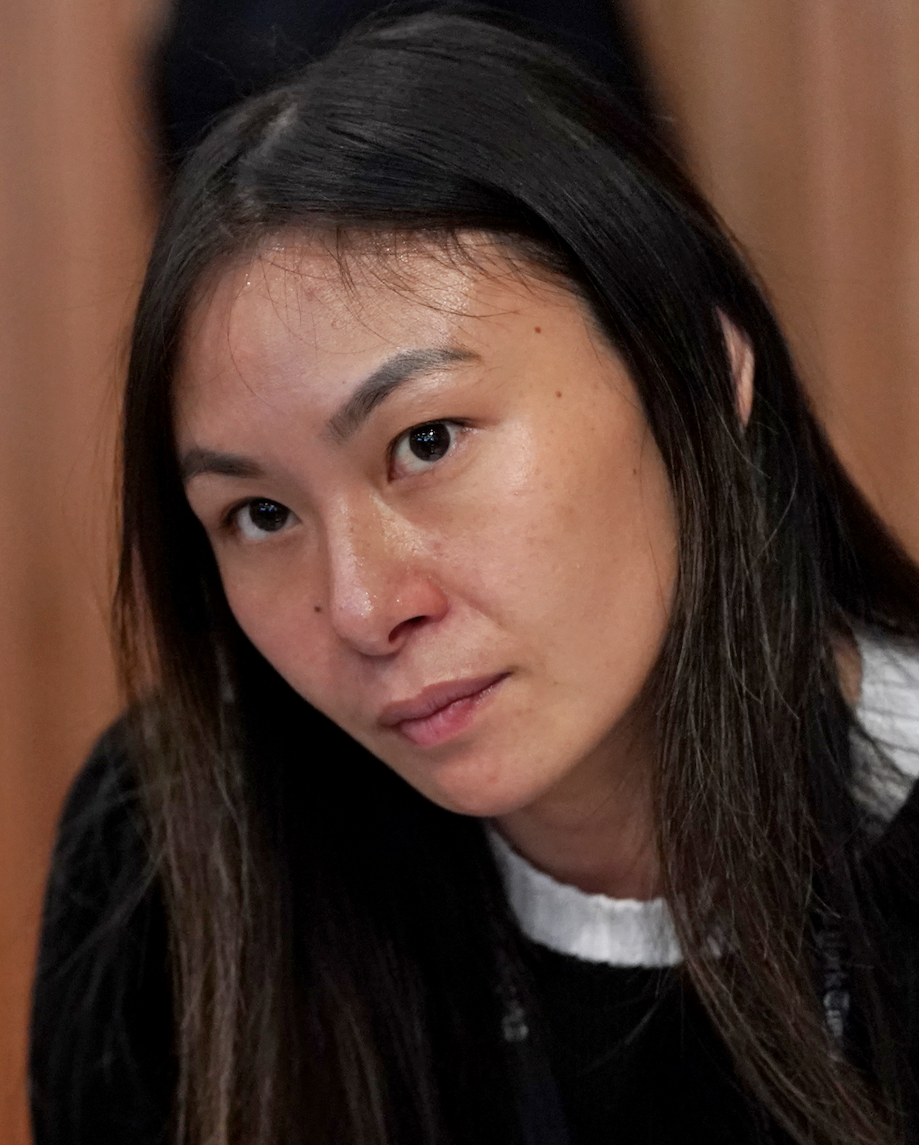
- Guo in 2025
- Born: October 14, 1994 (age 32); California, U.S.
- Education: Carnegie Mellon University (Dropped out)
- Known for: Co-founding Scale AI and Passes Inc.

Lucy Guo (born October 14, 1994) is an American entrepreneur who co-founded Scale AI in 2016 before being fired in 2018. In 2022, she founded an OnlyFans competitor known as Passes. Guo was the youngest self-made female billionaire until late 2025.

== Early life and education ==
Guo grew up in Fremont, California. Her parents were Chinese immigrant who worked as electrical engineers. She began coding at a young age; as a teenager she taught herself programming and earned money by developing bots for the online game Neopets and selling the in-game assets for profit. She later attended Foothill High School in Pleasanton.

Guo enrolled at Carnegie Mellon University, where she studied computer science but dropped out in 2014 after being selected for the Thiel Fellowship, a two-year $100,000 grant for young people to pursue entrepreneurial projects instead of completing their studies.

== Career ==
After leaving Carnegie Mellon, Guo interned at Facebook before joining Snapchat as the company's first female designer. At Snapchat, she helped develop Snap Maps. She then moved to Quora where she met Alexandr Wang. They co-founded Scale AI in 2016, but she was fired two years later in 2018.

In 2018, Guo launched an app called Apply to Date allowing users to create a dating resume.

In 2019, she launched Backend Capital, originally called Backend Ventures, a venture capital firm that primarily funded early-stage engineering startups.

In 2022, Guo founded Passes, an OnlyFans competitor. As a Miami party girl, she used her connections with Miami-based entertainment agencies to launch the company. It raised a $40 million Series A in 2024. Passes acquired other creator platforms, including Fanhouse, founded by Rosie Nguyen.

Passes was reported in 2024 to have allowed an account featuring a 12-year-old selling bikini photos after she had been banned by another platform. The account was removed only after the New York Times requested comment. In 2025, Passes and Guo were sued by another creator who stated that they had distributed sexually abusive material of her when she was a child.

When Meta invested $14.3 billion to acquire a 49% non-voting stake in Scale AI, valuing the company at over $29 billion, Guo became the world's youngest self-made female billionaire, displacing Taylor Swift from the position. In late 2025, the title passed to Luana Lopes Lara, co-founder of Kalshi. Guo was one of only six self-made female billionaires to reach the milestone before age 40 as of 2025, according to Forbes.

== Personal life ==
She was "living as a digital nomad" for a number of years before buying a $6.7 million apartment in 2020 in Miami where her parties caused conflict with neighbors. She was described by the New York Post in 2022 as "Miami's number one party girl."

As of 2024, she was residing in Los Angeles after purchasing another home in West Hollywood for $4.2 million.

In 2026, she released a tech house track, Champagne On Me.

In November 2026, Guo took Meta to court seeking Instagram location data on the viewers of a story posted by her ex-girlfriend, actress Wallis Day, to support a UK defamation lawsuit after Day accused Guo in the story of stealing hundreds of thousands of dollars’ worth of belongings to pressure her into signing an NDA in exchange for hush money, and of refusing to let emergency services enter her home during a medical emergency because Guo "had drugs everywhere". Day also accused Guo of sexually assaulting her.
