= Figma =

Online collaborative vector graphics editor

- A newly-created design project with an empty frame on Figma
- Developers: Figma, Inc.
- Release: September 27, 2016; 10 years ago

Stable release(s) [±]
- Windows: 126.11.7 / November 3, 2026; 4 days ago
- Android: 26.41 / October 29, 2026; 9 days ago
- iOS (Note: Including iPadOS): 26.41 / October 27, 2026; 11 days ago
- Operating system: Windows 10, 11; macOS 14+; Android 8+; iOS 18+; Web; Discontinued: iOS 17 (2026); macOS 13, iOS 16 (2025); macOS 12 (2024); Windows 7, 8, 8.1, macOS 11, iOS 15 (2023); macOS 10.15 (2022); macOS 10.14 (2021); macOS 10.13 (2020); macOS 10.12 (2019); macOS 10.11 (2018); macOS 10.10 (2017)
- Type: Vector graphics editor; Whiteboarding
- License: Proprietary
- Website: figma.com

Figma is a collaborative web-based application for user interface design. It supports the design of mobile apps, websites, and illustrations, with 13 million users as of 2025. It is the product of the eponymous Figma, Inc., founded in 2012 by Dylan Field and Evan Wallace.

Figma began as an application allowing multiple users to edit the same design simultaneously. Its early technology relied on WebGL and WebAssembly to render vector graphics in a web browser with hardware acceleration. Figma later expanded to add desktop and mobile companion apps, and features such as prompt-based design generation and video editing.

== Features ==
Figma allows users to create designs in three different modes: design, prototype and developer mode.

Design mode enables users to draw shapes, frames and components, apply styles and modify layers to organize their canvases.

Prototype mode creates interactive flows between frames and screens so that users can test UX, link frames to simulate navigation and set interactions like "On click" or "While hovering".

Developer mode or dev mode allows users to inspect elements for code snippets, download assets marked for export, see variables and tokens, and view dimensions easily.

These tools combined allow users to use Figma to create interactive designs for uses like web development.

In May 2025 at Figma Config 2025, Figma announced Figma Sites in Beta. The feature allows designers to publish designs directly to the web.

== History ==
Figma, Inc.
- Type: Public
- Traded as: NYSE: FIG (Class A)
- Industry: Software
- Founded: 2012; 14 years ago
- Founders: Dylan Field; Evan Wallace
- Headquarters: Phelan Building, San Francisco, California, United States
- Key people: Dylan Field (chairman and CEO)
- Products: Figma; FigJam; Figma Slides; Figma Sites; Figma Make; Figma Buzz; Figma Draw; Figma Weave
- Revenue: ▲US$1.06 billion (2025)
- Operating income: ▼US$–1.29 billion (2025)
- Net income: ▼US$–1.25 billion (2025)
- Total assets: ▲US$2.35 billion (2025)
- Total equity: ▲US$1.51 billion (2025)
- Members: 13 million users (2025)
- Number of employees: 1,886 (2025)
- Website: https://www.figma.com

=== 2012–2016: Founding and launch ===
Dylan Field and Evan Wallace began working on Figma in 2012 while studying computer science at Brown University. Wallace studied graphics and was a Teaching Assistant for the Computer Science Department, while Field chaired the CS Departmental Undergraduate Group. Field was named a Thiel Fellow in 2012, earning him $234,460 in exchange for taking a leave of absence from college. Wallace joined Field in California after completing his degree in computer science, and the two began working on the company full time.

The original objective behind Figma was to enable "anyone [to] be creative by creating free, simple, creative tools in a browser". Field and Wallace experimented with different ideas, including software for drones and a meme generator, before settling on web-based graphics editor software. The software aimed to enable real-time collaboration among designers, with the goal of bringing to design the collaborative capabilities that Google Docs had introduced for text editing a decade earlier. In a 2012 article, the company's early scope was vaguely described by The Brown Daily Herald as "a technology startup that will allow users to creatively express themselves online". That article reported that the company's first ideas revolved around 3D content generation, and subsequent ideas focused on photo editing and object segmentation.

By 2015, Figma had built a web-based tool for user interface design that allows for many simultaneous users. In an interview with VentureBeat that year, Field discussed the ability of WebGL in accessing a computer's graphics processing unit (GPU) from the browser. He said that Figma's "viewer" application was written in Skew, a new programming language at the time, while the rest of the application was based in C++. The software utilized WebGL and WebAssembly to render complex vector graphics with hardware acceleration.

Figma started offering a free invite-only preview program on December 3, 2015. It saw its first public release on September 27, 2016.

==== Funding ====
In June 2013, Figma raised $3.8 million in seed funding (lead investor Index Ventures and Terrence Rohan). In December 2015, the company raised $14 million in Series A funding (lead investor Greylock). In February 2018, Figma raised $25 million in a Series B round (lead investor Kleiner Perkins).

In February 2019, Figma raised $40 million in Series C funding (lead investor Sequoia Capital). In April 2020, Figma raised $50 million in a Series D funding round (lead investor Andreessen Horowitz). In June 2021, Figma raised $200 million in a Series E funding round (lead investor Durable Capital Partners).

=== 2017–2024: Expansion, failed acquisition ===
On October 22, 2019, Figma launched Figma Community, allowing designers to publish their work for others to view and adapt.

On April 21, 2021, Figma launched a digital whiteboarding capability called FigJam, allowing users to collaborate with sticky notes, emojis and drawing tools.

On June 9 2021, Figma enters the ICO under management by Polychain Capital.

In June 2022, Google for Education announced that it would be partnering with Figma to bring its design and prototyping platform, as well as FigJam, to education Chromebooks.

In June 2023, Figma launched Dev Mode to help developers translate designs into code faster.

In June 2024, Figma launched Figma Slides (also known as Flides) in beta, a presentation programme that allows users to collaborate on presentation slides.

==== Attempted acquisition by Adobe ====
By April 2020, Figma was valued at more than $2 billion. and $10 billion by the end of May 2021. On September 15, 2022, Adobe announced it had entered into an agreement to acquire Figma for about $20 billion in cash and stock, the company's largest acquisition to-date, with Field remaining as CEO. Members of the design community showed concerns for the future of the product — including potential or mandatory integration with Adobe Creative Cloud, or being forced to adopt business models otherwise unfavorable in comparison to those presently used by Figma. Adobe shares fell by 17% following the announcement.

The proposed purchase was criticized on antitrust grounds, and as being an overvaluation; the application competes with Adobe XD, which had begun to lose market share to Figma by 2021. John Naughton went as far as comparing the purchase to Facebook's acquisition of WhatsApp, a move that was intended to prevent it from growing into a competitor to Facebook's core businesses. On November 2, 2022, it was reported that the US Department of Justice had begun an investigation of the merger. In February 2023, it was announced the European Commission would review the acquisition under the European Union merger laws.

On December 18, 2023, Figma and Adobe both announced they were mutually agreeing to abandon their merger, with Adobe citing that there was "no clear path to receive necessary regulatory approvals from the European Commission and the UK Competition and Markets Authority." Adobe said it would pay the $1 billion reverse breakup fee to Figma as part of the initial agreement. After the Adobe acquisition of Figma fell through, CB Insights noted that based on earning metrics, Figma would be worth between $8.3-9 billion.

=== Since 2025: Feature additions, IPO ===
At the Config 2025 conference (May 7, 2025) in San Francisco and London, Figma introduced four new major product lines:

- Figma Sites – AI-driven website and web app builder with CMS features.
- Figma Make – AI prototype-and-code generation tool powered by Anthropic's Claude 3.7 model.
- Figma Buzz – AI-enhanced marketing content creator aimed at brands.
- Figma Draw – A richer vector illustration tool with advanced brushes and editing, rivaling Adobe Illustrator.

The new features allowed users to generate interface designs mobile apps, websites or graphic illustrations by entering a prompt with a description of the requirements.

By this time, Figma's website provided desktop application versions for macOS, Windows, and Linux for download and installation. The desktop apps supported offline work, allowing the users continue editing without internet connection. Any offline changes would sync once the app reconnects to the internet. The company also offered a companion mobile app, and had over 3000 plugins.

Figma acquired Israeli AI startup Weavy for over $200 million in October 2025, and established a new R&D center in Tel Aviv. The company rebranded Weavy under the new name Figma Weave, with the team and technology now integrated into Figma's platform to enhance AI-powered image and video editing tools and creative workflows.

In February 2026, Figma announced integrations with both Anthropic's Claude Code and OpenAI's Codex via the Model Context Protocol, allowing engineers to iterate between design and code environments without leaving their existing tools. In April 2026, Mike Krieger, Anthropic's chief product officer and co-founder of Instagram, resigned from Figma's board of directors after reports that Anthropic's upcoming Claude Opus 4.7 model would include design tools competing directly with Figma's core product. Figma's stock rose approximately 5% following the disclosure.

==== Initial public offering ====
In April 2025, Figma announced that it had begun to file confidential paperwork for an initial public offering (IPO) with the Securities and Exchange Commission (SEC). On July 1, 2025, the company formally filed for a listing on the New York Stock Exchange (NYSE) with the ticker symbol "FIG". The company went public on July 31, with shares opening at $85 and closing the day with a market value of $56.3 billion after the share price more than tripled its IPO price. Figma had 13 million users by this time. The share price has since dropped below $20 at a less than $10 billion market value in June 2026.

== See also ==
- Comparison of vector graphics editors
- Whiteboarding
- Vector network
- Computer-aided software engineering
- Canva
