= Cathy Tie =

Canadian entrepreneur

- Born: 19 April 1996 (age 30); China
- Known for: Thiel Fellowship, Ranomics, Cervin

Chinese name
- Simplified Chinese: 铁颖
Transcriptions
Standard Mandarin
- Hanyu Pinyin: Tiě yǐng

Cheng Cheng "Cathy" Tie is a Canadian serial entrepreneur who is the founder and CEO of Origin Genomics. A 2015 recipient of the Thiel Fellowship, Tie founded her first company, Ranomics, at age 18. As of 2026, she serves as a director of the Cold Spring Harbor Laboratory (CSHL) Association, a group that organizes outreach and fundraising activities for CSHL.

== Early life and education ==
Tie's family moved from China to Canada when she was four years old. Her father has a master's degree in chemical engineering; she has described both of her parents as entrepreneurs. Growing up in Mississauga, Ontario, she attended the Glenforest Secondary School (International Baccalaureate Diploma Program).

At 15, Tie worked on an immunology project with researchers at the University of Toronto, which she published the following year in the Canadian Young Scientist Journal. She was a co-author of a related paper published after her departure in 2018.

Tie began studying bioinformatics at Trinity College, Toronto but left after less than a year. In that period, she worked at Mount Sinai Hospital in the genetics research laboratory of Frederick Roth. After hearing about a biotech startup competition, Tie teamed up with Leo Wan, a graduate student in Roth's lab, to create a business plan for a genomics start-up. They later presented their business plan to IndieBio, an accelerator run by SOSV, which provided them with $100,000 in seed capital. In 2014, Tie left college to participate in IndieBio and work on the project in San Francisco. In 2015, Tie was named a Thiel Fellow.

== Career ==
Tie founded Ranomics as its CEO in 2015. In a JLabs profile, Tie explained that the company's focus was to investigate variants of unknown significance (VUS) that caused genetic tests to fail or misdiagnose patients. Ranomics provided oncogene mutation analysis services to genetic testing firms. In 2016, Ranomics published a database of 2,000 variants of the BRCA1 gene, whose mutants are tied to breast and ovarian cancer. Clinicians could use this data to predict the oncogenicity of new variants.

In 2018, Tie was named a partner in Cervin Ventures, an early-stage venture firm based in San Francisco. In 2019, Tie founded Locke Bio, a telemedicine and data-mining company based in Toronto that offers online telemedicine and telepharmacy services to consumers while building health datasets. In 2020, Tie and Locke Bio published a free online COVID-19 assessment tool that allowed people to check their symptoms online by filling out an online symptom questionnaire and consulting with a doctor over video chat.

In February 2025, Tie and Josie Zayner announced the Los Angeles Project, also known as the Embryo Corporation, which Tie had incorporated in 2023. The company's goal is to modify animal embryos, with one of its plans calling for the addition of horn genes to horse embryos to create a unicorn.

In August 2025, Tie co-founded Manhattan Genomics, a company whose goal, according to Tie, was disease correction, not enhancement. Manhattan Genomics shut down four months later in December 2025.

In 2026, Tie became a director of the Cold Spring Harbor Laboratory (CSHL) Association, a group that hosts outreach and fundraising events to support CSHL. Tie previously announced that she had made a "modest gift" to CSHL.

== Personal life ==
In April 2025, Tie and He Jiankui stated that they married in Beijing. On 24 July 2025, Tie announced on X that she and He had separated. She later confirmed that the two had not been legally married.

== Awards ==
In 2015, Tie was selected as a Thiel Fellow. In 2017, the Kairos Society chose Ranomics as one of its "Kairos 50" for "improving the understanding of human genetics." In 2018, Forbes magazine listed Tie as one of its Healthcare "30 under 30". In 2019, Forbes also included Tie among its "30 under 30" innovators in Canada.
