= Dylan Field =

American entrepreneur

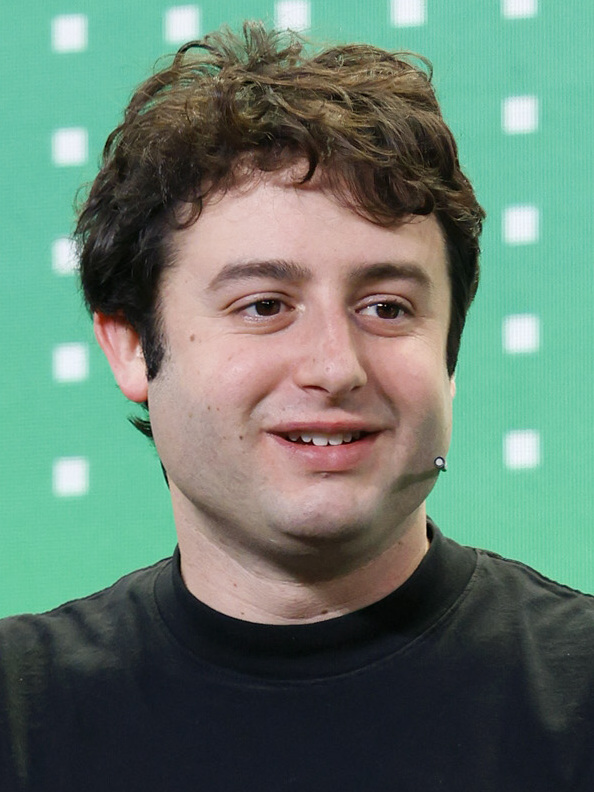
- Field in 2022
- Born: 1992 (age 33–34)
- Education: Brown University (dropped out)
- Occupations: Technology executive; entrepreneur
- Years active: 2012–present
- Known for: Figma; Thiel Fellow
- Spouse: Elena Nadolinski

Dylan Field (born 1992) is an American billionaire technology businessman, and co-founder of Figma, a web-based vector graphics editing software company. Field founded Figma in 2012 with Evan Wallace, whom he had met while they were computer science students at Brown University. In 2012, Field received a Thiel Fellowship, a $100,000 grant conditioned on his leaving school to begin working full-time on the company. Field moved to San Francisco with Wallace, where they spent four years preparing the software for its first public release in 2016.

In 2015, Field was named to the Forbes 30 under 30 list. He owns a 9% stake in Figma. In June 2026, Forbes estimated Field's net worth to be $1.1 billion, down from $6.6 billion in August 2025.

== Early life ==
=== Childhood ===
Field grew up in Penngrove, California. He is Jewish. Field was an only child, named after the poet Dylan Thomas. His father worked as a respiratory therapist at Santa Rosa Memorial Hospital and his mother as a resource specialist teacher at Thomas Page Elementary School. As a child, Field was adept at math, learning algebra at age six. Field's father told a Santa Rosa area newspaper in 2012 that Dylan found middle school so boring that "he mostly hung out with a janitor, who was kind of a math savant." Field was interested in computer science from a young age and participated in FIRST Robotics. He also participated in the arts as a child, acting with credits in TV ads for eToys.com and for Windows XP, and taking an interest in design starting in middle school.

Field attended high school at Technology High School, a magnet school for science, technology, engineering, and math on the campus of Sonoma State University. While in high school, Field built robots and websites for friends. He also worked with social media researcher Danah Boyd, who ultimately wrote one of Field's letters of recommendation for college.

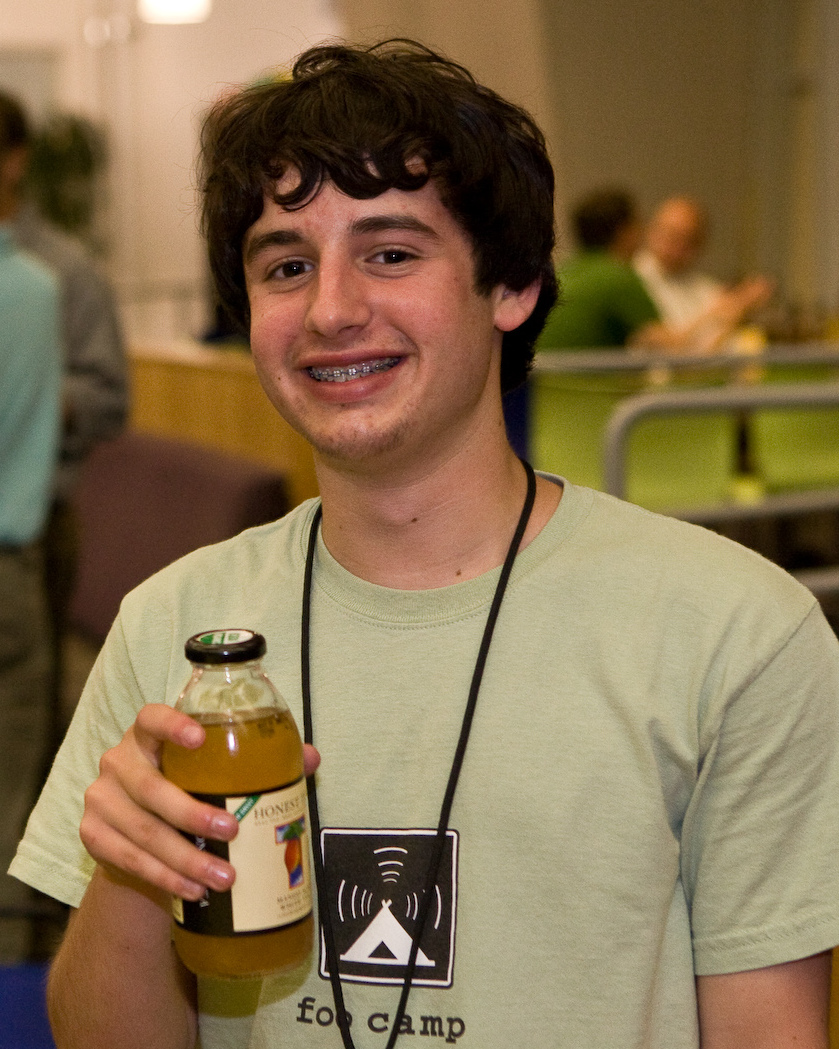
Field attending Foo Camp 2008 as a high school student

=== College ===
In 2009, Field enrolled at Brown University, where he studied computer science. Field was an involved member of Brown's computer science department: in 2011, he organized a hackathon in which 150 students participated, and starting in late 2011, he co-chaired Brown's CS Departmental Undergraduate Group.

While attending Brown University, Field interned at LinkedIn and the news-sharing startup Flipboard. At his LinkedIn internship, Field helped devise a social-impact program. His second summer, he interned as a software engineering intern at Flipboard. Afterward, Field began to doubt his plan to major in computer science and math, so he took spring semester off during his junior year to pursue a six-month internship at Flipboard in Palo Alto, this time as a technical product manager.

Around that time, Field met Evan Wallace, another computer science undergraduate studying at Brown; the two decided they wanted to start a company together. A year ahead of Field at Brown, Wallace studied graphics and worked as a teaching assistant in the computer science department.

During a semester away from Brown, Field applied to the Thiel Fellowship, a US$100,000 grant awarded to young entrepreneurs by investor Peter Thiel on the condition that they drop out of college for at least two years. Field's parents were initially not supportive. Field recalled in 2012, "They totally did not want me to apply." His father told the same interviewer, "Pretty much everything we earned went to education." In its second year, the Thiel Fellowship had attracted 500 student applicants; 40 finalists were named and 20 were ultimately selected. Field was awarded the Thiel Fellowship in May 2012 and dropped out of Brown to accept it.

Field had originally intended to pursue a degree in math and computer science and graduate after four years. Field said in a 2012 interview that Brown had been his "dream school" but that he "wasn't feeling like [he] was getting as much out of it as before." Field said in that interview that he intended to go back to Brown one day, noting the school allowed leaves of absence for up to five years.

== Career ==
=== Starting Figma (2012) ===
Field was named a Thiel Fellow in 2012, earning him $100,000 in exchange for taking a leave of absence from college. The Thiel Fellowship was begun in 2011. At the time, the Thiel Fellowship was designed to select 20 "creative and motivated young people" under the age of 20 each year. Recipients were given $100,000 each to leave college for two years and work on their ideas as startup companies.

In summer 2012 Field co-founded Figma with Evan Wallace, who joined Field in California after completing his degree in computer science that Spring.

Field's original objective was to "make it so that anyone can be creative by creating free, simple, creative tools in a browser." Field and Wallace tried many different ideas, including software for drones and a meme generator. The company was described in a 2012 article by The Brown Daily Herald more vaguely as "a technology startup that will allow users to creatively express themselves online." That article reported that the company's first ideas revolved around 3D content generation, and subsequent ideas focused on photo editing and object segmentation.

=== Early challenges (2012–2015) ===
Field's inexperience in leadership resulted in challenges both leading Figma's early team and challenges fundraising. A beta version of Figma's first product took years to launch, and many frustrated employees quit before it did. Field said in a 2021 interview, "I was just not a very good manager when I started Figma. I was an intern before that, so I had a lot to learn. I was always very optimistic; I thought that shipping was right around the corner, so I wasn’t setting expectations correctly."

At one point early on in Figma's existence, Field said he was faced with a potential exodus of disaffected employees. A 2021 article reported that the situation had grown dire enough that the senior members of his team eventually "staged a sort of managerial intervention." Field described it: "It was like, 'You need to get some help.' Afterward I took a few days away from the office. It was just hard."

Raising funding was a challenge for similar reasons. Field told a reporter from Business Insider that, when meeting with investors in 2013–2014, the company wasn't clear about what product it was building and what problems that product would solve. Field recalled that he experienced a "wake up call" when investor John Lilly turned down the chance to invest in Figma's seed round and said, "I don't think you know what you're doing yet." Field sought out further advice and improved the company's pitch; Lilly ultimately led Figma's US$14 million funding round in December 2015, its largest up until that point.

=== Post-product launch (2015–present) ===
Figma launched its first beta product in late 2015, its first public product in late 2016, and its first paid product in 2017. Figma's initial product met with mixed reviews.

In April 2020, Figma raised venture financing that valued the company at US$2 billion. Figma had acquired customers including Microsoft, Airbnb, GitHub, Square, Zoom, and Uber.

A 2021 Forbes profile reported that Field spent most of the COVID-19 pandemic "listening to Figma's users": reading customer support tickets, responding to users on Twitter, and visiting clients in person in Ukraine and Nigeria.

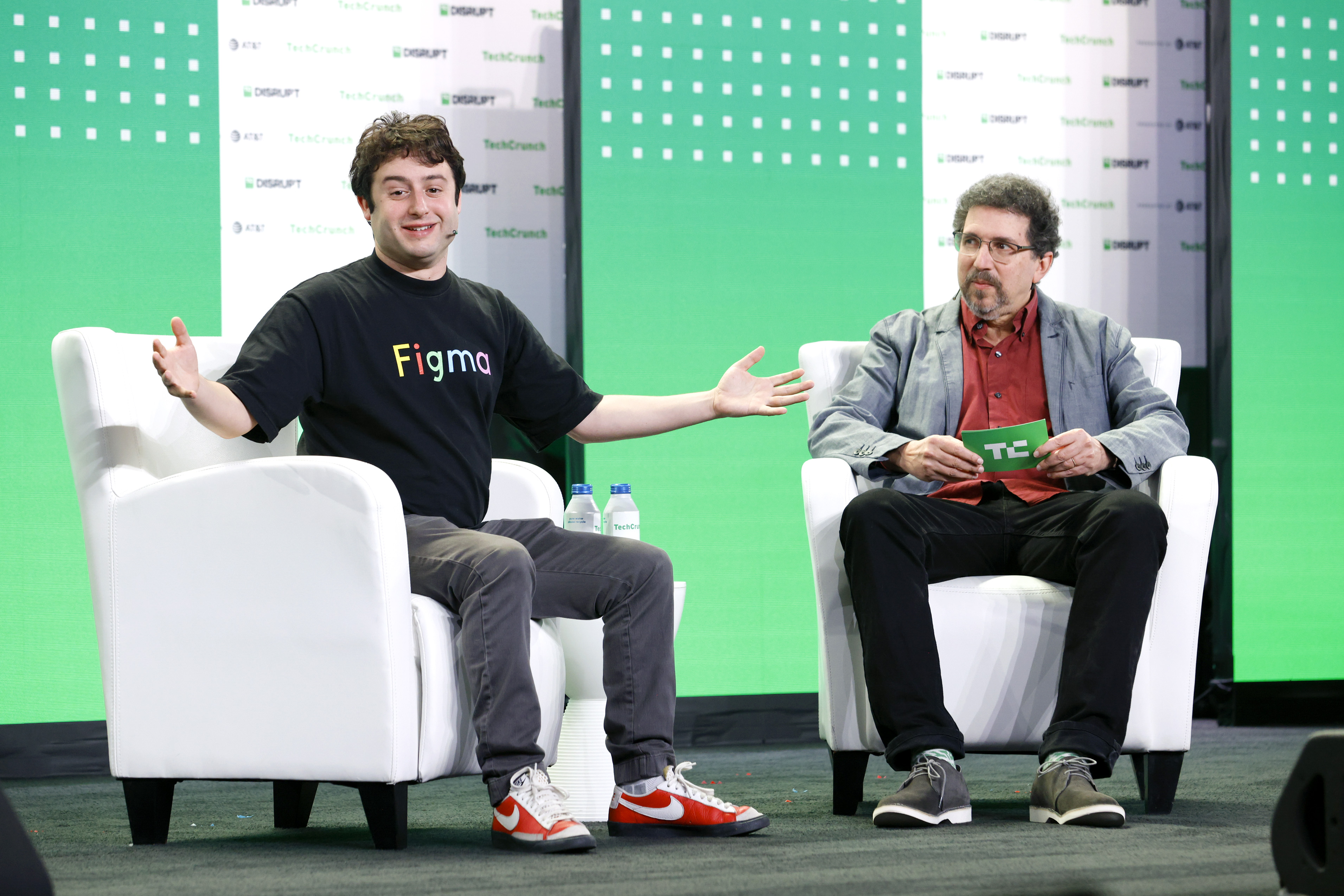
Field speaks at TechCrunch Disrupt 2022

In 2021, the company was valued at US$10 billion in a subsequent round of financing. Forbes reported in 2021 that the company had US$75 million in revenue in 2020; that Joe Biden's presidential campaign managed all of its visual assets in Figma; and that "when toilet paper ran out across the U.S. in 2020, Kimberly-Clark drafted reorder forms using Figma's tools." Forbes estimated as a result of this valuation that Field and co-founder Evan Wallace were both "near-billionaires."

In 2022, Adobe was blocked from buying the design startup for $20 billion.

In July 2025, the company held its initial public offering on the New York Stock Exchange.

== Other activities ==
Field is an angel investor in venture-backed startups, including OpenSea (founded by Devin Finzer, a friend of Field's from Brown), Loom, Sunday Robotics, Warp, and Netlify.

Field is also an NFT collector. Field purchased his first CryptoPunk NFT in January 2018. He later described himself thinking at the time, "This is probably the stupidest thing I've ever done." In 2021 it was reported that Field sold a CryptoPunk NFT for $7.5 million, the highest ever sale price for a CryptoPunk. In the days afterward, Field discussed the sale on The Good Time Show, a popular Clubhouse show, comparing the sold NFT to "a digital Mona Lisa".

This was Field's second reported sale, after a $1.5 million sale in February 2021. As of March 2021, Field owned 11 other CryptoPunks as well as NFTs from Autoglyphs and Beeple. At that time, Forbes reported Field's profits from collecting to be $9.5 million.

== Personal life ==
Field is married. In April 2021, Field's wife, Elena, was pregnant with their first child.

== Recognition ==
Field has received several accolades in connection with his co-founding of Figma.

- In 2015, Field was named to the Forbes 30 under 30 list.
- In 2019, Field was named an INC Rising Star.
- In 2020, Field was named one of Business Insider's "10 people transforming the technology industry."
- In 2022, Field was named to Fortune magazine's 40 Under 40 list
