= Passes Inc. =

American content monetization platform

- Type: Private
- Industry: Social media, Creator economy
- Founded: 2022
- Founder: Lucy Guo
- Headquarters: Los Angeles, California, United States
- Area served: Worldwide
- Key people: Lucy Guo (CEO)
- Products: Subscription platform, CRM tools
- Services: Content monetization, Fan engagement
- Website: www.passes.com

Passes Inc. (founded in 2022) is an American creator monetization and social media platform. A competitor to OnlyFans, it allows content creators to earn revenue directly from their audiences through subscriptions, gated content, and personalized interactions. The company is headquartered in Los Angeles, California.

== History ==
Passes was founded in 2022 by Lucy Guo, a co-founder of the artificial intelligence company Scale AI.

The company raised $9 million in seed funding in 2022, led by Multicoin Capital, with participation from Paris Hilton’s 11:11 Media, Jake Paul’s Anti Fund, and Kevin Hartz, Eventbrite co-founder. Two years later, Passes completed a $40 million Series A funding round led by Bond Capital, with additional participation from Crossbeam Ventures and Skims co-founders Emma and Jens Grede. As of 2025, Passes has raised around $50 million in venture capital funding and has paid more than $100 million to creators.

In July 2023, Passes acquired Fanhouse, a competing creator-monetization platform. The following year, the company expanded its operations to include the name, image, and likeness (NIL) market.

== Child sexual abuse material ==
Passes was reported in 2024 to have allowed an account featuring a 12-year-old selling bikini photos after she had been banned by another platform. The account was removed only after the New York Times requested comment. In 2025, Passes and Guo were sued by another creator who stated that they had distributed sexually abusive material of her when she was a child. Passes platform denied the allegation stating that individuals involved were not its authorized representatives.

== Platform features and business model ==
Passes operates as a subscription-based social media platform that allows creators with at least 100,000 followers on other social media platforms to monetize fan engagement. Creators can offer paid subscriptions, subscriber-only posts, direct messaging, livestreams, one-on-one video calls, tipping, and digital merchandise. The company earns revenue through a revenue-sharing model, taking a variable percentage of creator earnings, with certain plans also including transaction fees depending on the services used.

The platform integrates analytics tools, automated sales messaging, tools for live-streaming, tiered subscription levels and content-protection features such as anti-screenshot and anti-screen-recording technology. It also includes CRM tools (customer relationship management system), used by creators to track audience activity and spending patterns.

Passes' platform supports multiple verticals including lifestyle creators, streamers, athletes, etc.

== See also ==
- Creator economy
- Subscription business model
- Influencer marketing
- Customer relationship management
- Patreon
- OnlyFans
- Fanfix
