= Vector pack =

A vector pack is a set or collection of vector graphics packaged around a common theme. Vector packs allow for quicker and easier iteration or prototyping of a design by providing the user with a number of pre-made, ready-to-use assets. The themes themselves can vary from practical icons and symbols to more decorative designs, like floral motifs, anatomical elements, nature or heraldry.

Vector packs are typically distributed as a compressed archive or folder containing a collection of .SVG, .EPS, or .AI files, which can be used inside a vector graphics editor such as Adobe Illustrator, CorelDRAW, or Inkscape. They are most commonly obtained from various online libraries and digital storefronts.

Opening a vector pack using a raster program can limit editability or convert the vector elements into rasterized bitmap images. However, if the vector shapes are stored in the .CSH (Photoshop Custom Shape) file format they can be used inside Adobe Photoshop and remain vector-based. CSH files can be loaded into Photoshop as custom shape presets, making their contents directly available within the application.
