= Lucy Fato =

American corporate attorney

Luciana "Lucy" Fato (born 1966) is an American corporate attorney.

Since May 2024 she has been Executive Vice President & General Counsel for Seaport Entertainment Group.

Prior to joining Seaport Entertainment Group, she was vice chair and general counsel at American International Group (AIG). She held senior roles at Marsh & McLennan Companies, and McGraw Hill Financial (now S&P Global).

== Early life and education ==
Fato was born in Pittsburgh, Pennsylvania in 1966. She attended The Ellis School in Pittsburgh, graduating in 1984.

She received a BA in business and economics from the University of Pittsburgh in 1988, and a JD from the University of Pittsburgh School of Law in 1991.

== Career ==
=== Davis Polk & Wardwell ===
Fato began her legal career in 1991 at the law firm Davis Polk & Wardwell in New York City. In 2000 she was elected a corporate partner in the capital markets department of the firm. She advised multinational companies on a range of corporate matters, and gained an increasing reputation as a problem solver capable of resolving high-profile government lawsuits.

=== Marsh & McLennan Companies ===
In September 2005, Fato was hired by Marsh & McLennan Companies (MMC) as Deputy General Counsel and Corporate Secretary. She was heavily involved in the sale of two former Marsh & McLennan businesses: Putnam Investments in 2007, and the Kroll corporate-intelligence unit in 2010. In addition, she helped reshape MMC's global legal department, overhauled the company's governance practices, and reduced legal operations expenses by more than 50%.

=== McGraw Hill Financial ===
In August 2014, Fato became executive vice president and general counsel of McGraw Hill Financial, whose brands included Standard & Poor's (S&P). At the time, S&P was dealing with several high-profile government lawsuits concerning its ratings of mortgage-backed securities prior to the 2008 financial crisis. Fato immediately employed her skills in relationship-building and conciliation to resolve the lawsuits; on the morning of her first day as general counsel she phoned several government lawyers. Within six months she negotiated favorable global settlements with the Department of Justice, the Securities and Exchange Commission, and 22 state attorneys general.

She left McGraw Hill Financial in October 2015.

=== Nardello ===
In October 2016, Fato joined the global private investigative firm Nardello & Co, headquartered in New York, where she served in multiple roles, including managing director, head of the Americas, and global general counsel. During her time at Nardello she was credited with growing the firm's network and global culture of teamwork. When she left the firm in October 2017 she remained on Nardello's newly formed advisory board, to help guide it in its next phase of growth.

=== AIG ===
In October 2017, Fato became executive vice president and general counsel of AIG, succeeding Peter Solmssen. She was appointed by the new CEO of AIG, Brian Duperreault, who had been the CEO of Marsh & McLennan Companies during her tenure there. She was also AIG's interim head of human resources from October 2018 through July 2019 and again in 2022.

From September 2023 through March 2024 she was vice chair at AIG.

At AIG, her duties as general counsel included overseeing global legal, compliance, and regulatory matters. She was also part of the company's executive leadership team and participated in all strategic and policy decisions regarding AIG's operations. In addition to overseeing legal, compliance, and regulatory matters for AIG, in 2021, she was tasked with responsibility for its government and public affairs, as well as communications.

=== Seaport Entertainment Group ===
After her departure from AIG, Fato joined Seaport Entertainment Group as general counsel and corporate secretary.

== Board memberships ==
In 2018 and 2021 Fato was appointed for a three-year term to the New York State Insurance Advisory Board. She is also on the board of directors of the Life Insurance Council of New York.

She is on the advisory board of Nardello & Co., and was a cybersecurity group member of the Aspen Institute.

She is on the boards of directors of the Coalition for the Homeless and previously served on the board of directors of Advocates for Children of New York. Fato served on the board of trustees of the Randall's Island Park Alliance and was a member of its executive committee.

During her time at AIG, Fato was a member of the board of directors of Corebridge Financial. She stepped down from her role on the board in April 2024.

Since 2020, Fato has been a board member of the Alfred E. Smith Memorial Foundation. She has served on the board of the Harvard Law School Center for the Legal Profession since 2023.

== Awards and honors ==
In 2009, Fato was inducted into the YWCA-NYC Academy of Women Leaders.

She was named one of Ethisphere Magazine's "Attorneys Who Matter" in 2015 and 2017. In 2017, the New York County Lawyers Association honored her as one of its Outstanding Women in the Legal Profession.

In 2018 and 2019 she was named by the National Association of Corporate Directors' NACD Directorship magazine as one of the Directorship 100, which recognizes the most influential people in corporate boardrooms. In 2019 she was named one of Crain's New York's Notable Women in Law, and she was one of three recipients of Legal Momentum's 19th annual Aiming High awards.
