= Thiel Fellowship =

Scholarship founded by Peter Thiel

- Type: Fellowship
- Funded by: Peter Thiel through the Thiel Foundation
- Amount: US$250,000
- Frequency of selection: Annual
- Number of recipients: 20 in 2026
- Website: thielfellowship.org

The Thiel Fellowship is a fellowship founded by billionaire Peter Thiel in 2011 through the Thiel Foundation. The fellowship is intended for individuals aged 22 or younger, without a university degree, and offers them a total of $250,000 over two years, as well as guidance and other resources, to drop out of school and pursue other work, which could involve scientific research, creating a startup, or working on a social movement. Selection for the fellowship is through a competitive annual process. In addition to the grant, fellows gain mentorship and access to a community of founders and resources offered by the Thiel Foundation.

== History ==
Peter Thiel announced the Thiel Fellowship (originally named 20 Under 20) at TechCrunch Disrupt in September 2010.

Thiel had initially intended to found a university but he realized that such an institution would not align with his vision of education. The day before the TechCrunch event, he was flying on a plane when reading the script of the movie The Social Network, which portrayed him as a ruthless capitalist. He disliked the portrayal. The idea of an anti-Rhodes scholarship came to him and a group of Thiel Capital employees. He urgently called up Michael Gibson, who had just been recruited one day before originally to help Thiel teach a course at Stanford, to help flesh out the plan. Gibson later recounted that he and others at Thiel Capital were still working on the details right up to the moment Thiel went on the stage at TechCrunch. One week later, Danielle Strachman was hired to help lead the program.

The first round of fellows, based on applications made at the end of 2010, was announced in May 2011. The second round of fellows, based on applications made at the end of 2011, was announced in June 2012. That year, the fellowship launched a website called "20 Under 20 Documentary Series" that features an online documentary series of four Thiel Fellowship recipients.

The third class (announced in May 2013) included 22 fellows working on projects from garment manufacturing and B2B web products to ARM powered servers and biomedicine. The class included 7 fellows from outside of the US.

By the fourth year, the fellowship had achieved few successes. In 2015, Thiel changed the rules so that young people as old as 22 could join as well.

Strachman recalled that she and Gibson often discussed with Thiel about the candidates Strachman and Gibson had interviewed, and the candidates Thiel had interviewed. She remarked that Thiel sometimes dismissed candidates based on intuition.

In 2015, Strachman and Gibson left and, with the backing of Thiel, started their own venture fund named 1517 to "scale that further and expand the support and community that the Thiel Fellowship started." (the fund backs "companies led by college dropouts and people who never studied in higher ed" in general)

In early February 2025, Elon Musk used several Thiel Fellows in an attempt to take over operations of the Department of the Treasury through the Trump administration's Department of Government Efficiency (DOGE).

The value of the grant has been raised to US$250,000 from US$100,000 since the class of 2026.

Known mentors have included Keith Rabois from the Founders Fund, Naval Ravikant of AngelList and Thiel Fellows such as Joshua Browder, Lucy Guo, and Dylan Field.

In a July 2014 interview with Bill Kristol, Peter Thiel compared the modern university to the corrupt Church in 1514, where people were buying indulgences—the equivalent, he suggested, to the salvation a modern diploma represents—rather than pursuing intrinsic values. He believed that, as with the Reformation, meaningful change would come from outside first before any possible internal pressure to adapt emerged. In December 2014, during a talk hosted by the Farley Center for Entrepreneurship and Innovation, he clarified that he did not want to "blow up the universities and have everyone become an entrepreneur," but instead envisioned a future education system that "offers vastly different kinds of tracks for different people," where going to university would be just one of the available options, instead the current one-size-fits-all approach.

Thiel mentors and funds other college dropouts who do not receive the fellowship as well. CNBC notes that Mark Zuckerberg is probably "the most famous college-dropout-turned-tech-billionaire". Thiel was his long-time mentor and the first outside investor in Facebook. Business Insider also notes that Thiel's most famous mentees are not Thiel fellows, but Zuckerberg and Sam Altman (both college dropouts). Palmer Luckey tried to apply for the fellowship but missed the date. Nevertheless Thiel funded his first startup, Oculus VR, and the Founders Fund incubated the company he was primarily known for, Anduril Industries. Thiel was also the mentor of the Collison brothers and an early investor in their company Stripe.

== Reception ==
=== Initial perspectives ===
Initially, Thiel's announcement of the Fellowship met with diverse responses. Some, such as Jacob Weisberg, criticized Thiel's proposal for its utopianism and attack on the importance of education. Others, such as academic Vivek Wadhwa, expressed skepticism about whether the success or failure of the Thiel Fellowship would carry any broader lessons regarding the value of higher education or the wisdom of dropping out. In May 2011, shortly after the first Thiel Fellows were named, the admissions office at the Massachusetts Institute of Technology (MIT) congratulated two of its students for receiving the Fellowship; both MIT students would, the blog stated, be able to return to MIT to resume studies after completing the two-year fellowship if they desired.

A year after first Fellows were named, opinions on the program ranged from the skeptical and critical to the laudatory and optimistic. In 2012, Eric Markowitz offered a mixed review of the Thiel Fellowship in Inc. magazine. In 2013 the program attracted criticism for its limited results. In April, an article by Richard Nieva for PandoDaily took a close look at how the first batch of Thiel Fellows had fared, finding that some had succeeded and others planned to return to school in the fall once their two years were up. In September, Vivek Wadhwa wrote that the Fellowship had failed to produce notable successes to date, and its limited successes were instances where its Fellows were collaborating with experienced individuals. Also in October, former Harvard University President Larry Summers, speaking at The Nantucket Project conference, said:

I think the single most misdirected bit of philanthropy in this decade is Peter Thiel's special program to bribe people to drop out of college.

Thiel Fellow Dan Friedman, also a mentor for the Fellowship, published an October 2013 op-ed response, restating in TechCrunch the Fellowship's thesis, and arguing that liberal arts education was becoming less relevant. In a supportive December 2013 Wall Street Journal article, the Thiel Fellowship and its recipient's accomplishments were summarized, up to that point, in this way: "64 Thiel Fellows have started 67 for-profit ventures, raised $55.4 million in angel and venture funding, published two books, created 30 apps and 135 full-time jobs, and brought clean water and solar power to 6,000 Kenyans who needed it."

Thiel's biographer Max Chafkin notes that in the early days, Thiel mismanaged the fellows, showing favoritism and gave them unqualified staff with zero structure, leading to many fellows feeling like failures, followed by mental health issues and drug abuse.

=== Longer term perspectives ===
In October 2023, the Washington Post reported that: "Eleven of the 271 recipients of the Thiel Fellowship have founded unicorns so far, an impressive accomplishment that doesn’t even take into account the inspiring innovations of other fellows and the many exciting projects yet to mature."

The Fellowship's website counts 26 unicorns.

In a 2025 op-ed article for Bloomberg, finance researchers Aaron Brown and Richard Dewey remarked that despite early criticisms, the fellowship had achieved "shocking success", and not only finance-wise. The researchers named Laura Deming, Chris Olah and Boyan Slat as examples of fellows who had formed networks and infrastructure to develop science and technology. Regarding entrepreneurs, the researchers pointed out that other scholarships were also designed to identify high-potential students and offered networks of powerful people that Thiel arguably could not match, yet "All of them put together can’t match the kind of entrepreneurial success before age 35 of Thiel fellows" and that entrepreneurial institutes and incubators organized by colleges did not produce this kind of success too. They concluded that "Thiel has not proven that college is bad for everyone, nor that post-secondary education in the US is a dismal failure. But he has demonstrated a competing idea that has been vastly more successful, if only for a few students and only for certain types of projects." Back in 2013, Alexis Ohanian made the criticism that the program was not scalable: "There are two problems with Thiel’s education solution. First, the Thiel Fellowship isn’t scalable. Helping 20 kids a year is great, but more than 21 million students enroll in college each year, so the Thiel Fellowship is only helping less than 0.00000095 percent of students. The second problem is that giving a select number of students the option of going to college or getting $100,000 to work on a business creates a false and harmful dichotomy".

In a 2019 interview with Eric Weinstein, Thiel himself recognized that the Thiel Fellowship was not scalable. Nevertheless, Thiel and companies associated with him have offered other alternative education programs. From April 2025, Palantir Technologies has offered Palantir Meritocracy Fellowship, which gives high school graduates a four-month internship and a chance at full-time employment in exchange for skipping or delaying college enrollment (The motto is "Skip the debt. Skip the indoctrination. Get the Palantir Degree."). TheStreet remarks that the company is taking a page out of its founder's playbook. The Founders Fund is the major backer of Campus, a startup established by Tade Oyerinde to create an online alternative to traditional community colleges. Campus hires adjunct professors currently teaching at colleges like Princeton, NYU and Vanderbilt, paying them $8,000 a course, while offering students a laptop, Wi-Fi and tutoring. The Founders Fund's Trae Stephens has called the project "Thiel Fellowship for the masses". Sam Altman also backs the project.

Fabian Gruber, a Fellow whose startup Manex AI is already developed and sells software to BMW, Audi, Heinkel, Stellantis and others, said that he was not interested in the grant itself, but decided to join because of the ecosystem, with exciting people working on real problems. Commenting on the case of Manex AI, the German tech site IT-Boltwise notes that Thiel helps startups not only with financial resources, but also contacts and strategic support.

== Recipients ==
=== Notable recipients ===
Notable recipients include the following people (with their place of origin and the year they were awarded the fellowship is indicated in parentheses):

- Laura Deming (New Zealand, 2011) – founder and partner at Longevity Fund.
- Dale J. Stephens (U.S., 2011) – founder of Year On, formerly UnCollege, a gap year program with training in work skills and life skills
- Dylan Field (California, U.S., 2012) – co-founder and CEO of Figma, billionaire.
- Taylor Wilson (Arkansas, United States, 2012) – the second youngest person to produce nuclear fusion.
- Chris Olah (Canada, 2012): co-founder of Anthropic, billionaire.
- Ritesh Agarwal (India, 2013) – founder and CEO of OYO Rooms, billionaire.
- Austin Russell (California, United States, 2013) – founder and CEO of Luminar Technologies, the world's youngest self-made billionaire as of 2021.
- Vitalik Buterin (Russia, moved to Canada at age six, 2014) – co-creator of Ethereum, billionaire.
- Lucy Guo (California, United States, 2014) – co-founder Scale AI, founder of Passes, youngest self-made female billionaire.
- Stacey Ferreira (Arizona, United States, 2015) – co-founder of the gig worker platform, Forge.
- Cathy Tie (China, moved to Canada at age four, 2015) – founder of Ranomics, Partner at Cervin Ventures
- Boyan Slat (Delft, Netherlands, 2016) – founder and CEO of The Ocean Cleanup (NGO). Thiel, together Marc and Lynne Benioff, has donated to the project.
- Lani Lazzari (Pennsylvania, United States, 2017), founder of the skincare startup Simple Sugars.
- Tara Bosch (Canada, 2017), founder of low-sugar candy startup SmartSweets. In 2020, after acquisition by TPG Growth, she became a multimillionaire with a net worth of $200 million while retaining a major stake as the largest individual shareholder and continuing on the board.
- Iddris Sandu (Ghana, moved to California when young, 2018) – co-founder of Spatial Labs.
- Joshua Browder (UK, 2018) – founder and CEO of legal startup DoNotPay.
- Erin Smith (Kansas, United States, 2018) – creator of software to detect Parkinson's Disease.
- Shane Curran (Dublin, Ireland, 2020), founder of Evervault, which works on quantum-secured encryption.
- Kiara Nirghin (South Africa, 2022), founder of AI startup Chima.
- Luke Farritor (Nebraska, United States, 2024): develops AI that helps to decode the Herculaneum papyri, also gains a controversial reputation due to his work for Department of Government Efficiency.
