= Vivek Wadhwa =

Indian-American academic

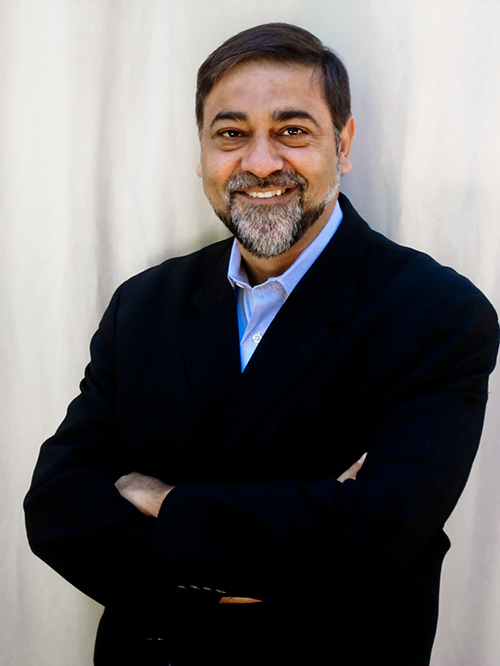
- Born: Delhi, India
- Education: University of Canberra (B.A., 1974); New York University Stern School of Business (M.B.A., 1986)

Vivek Wadhwa is an Indian-American technology entrepreneur and academic. He is Distinguished Fellow & Adjunct Professor at Carnegie Mellon's School of Engineering at Silicon Valley and Distinguished Fellow at the Labor and Worklife Program at Harvard Law School. He is also author of books Your Happiness Was Hacked: Why Tech Is Winning the Battle to Control Your Brain—and How to Fight Back, Driver in the Driverless Car, Innovating Women: The Changing Face of Technology, and Immigrant Exodus.

== Early life and education ==
Wadhwa was born in Delhi, India. He graduated from the University of Canberra in 1974 with a Bachelor of Arts in Computing Studies, and from New York University in 1986 with an MBA.

== Career ==
At Credit Suisse First Boston, Wadhwa led the development of a computer-aided software engineering (CASE) tool to develop client-server model software. First Boston spent $150 million on these development efforts. The CASE technology was spun off by First Boston into Seer Technologies in 1990 with an investment of $20 million by IBM. At Seer, Wadhwa was executive VP and chief technology officer. Seer developed tools to build client-server systems. Seer Technologies filed for an IPO in May 1995.

In 1997, Wadhwa founded Relativity Technologies, a company in Raleigh, North Carolina which developed tools for modernizing legacy COBOL programs. He left the company in 2004, and it was sold to Micro Focus in January, 2009.

After a heart attack, Wadhwa shifted his focus to academic research. Wadhwa is an executive-in-residence/adjunct professor at the Masters of Engineering Management Program and Director of Research at the Center for Research Commercialization at Duke University's Pratt School of Engineering; and a Distinguished Visiting Scholar at the Halle Institute for Global Learning, at Emory University. He has been a Senior Research Associate at Harvard Law School's Labor and Worklife Program and a visiting professor at the School of Information, at the University of California, Berkeley. He writes a regular column for The Washington Post, Bloomberg BusinessWeek, the American Society of Engineering Education's Prism Magazine, and Forbes, and has written for Foreign Policy. He is also the author of the 2012 non-fiction book The Immigrant Exodus: Why America Is Losing the Global Race to Capture Entrepreneurial Talent.

Wadhwa serves as an advisor to Malaysia on advancing innovation, science and technology through the Global Science and Innovation Advisory Council (GSIAC). He also advises Russia on how to create innovation ecosystems through his participation in the New York Academy of Sciences.

=== Columnist and pundit ===
Wadhwa writes a regular column for The Washington Post, Bloomberg BusinessWeek, the American Society for Engineering Education's Prism Magazine, Forbes, Foreign Policy, and The Wall Street Journal. Wadhwa has frequently argued that because of the low numbers of women technology CEOs, there is a problem with the system. In September 2014, Wadhwa released Innovating Women: The Changing Face of Technology, a book he co-authored with Farai Chideya and including contributions from hundreds of women. The book presented research about women in technology and argued that "it's not enough for company executives to make donations or be advisors to groups like Girls Who Code. They must take action and be the good example – just as Facebook did before its IPO. In September 2015 Wadhwa was recognized by Financial Times as "one of ten men worth emulating in his support of women." The article states, "Some feel it is wrong to focus on the work that men — rather than women — do to help women fulfill their potential at work. (Vivek Wadhwa on our list has been on the sharp end of such criticism). We disagree, and hope that recognising this varied group will engage and embolden other champions."

Wadhwa has advocated for more diversity in the technology industry. Wadhwa's research, public debates and articles call for greater inclusion of not only women but also African Americans, Hispanics, and older people. An MSNBC article by Alicia Maule on November 14, 2014 quotes Wadhwa as saying, "Venture capital is in dismal shape. It produces low returns because it's been the bastion of the boys club, which is not the model that needs to be followed. You need men and women. African-American and Latino – diversity is a catalyst to innovation." Wadhwa was featured as a mentor to the black technology community in the CNN documentary "Black in America" and has argued for the inclusion of more blacks in technology in the CNN program "Black in America: The New Promised Land, Silicon Valley" as well as in multiple articles including "We need a black Mark Zuckerberg" "Women of Color in Tech: How Can We Encourage Them" and "The Face of Success, Part 4: Blacks in Silicon Valley".

Wadhwa has researched old and young entrepreneurs and has argued that older entrepreneurs tend to be more successful. He has written several articles arguing that VCs should invest in them. The articles include: The case for old entrepreneurs, Innovation without Age Limits, When It Comes To Founding Successful Startups, Old Guys Rule and Silicon Valley's Dark Secret: It's All About Age.

Wadhwa has researched engineering education in India, China, and the US. He has argued in many articles that US education is superior and that education is important for US competitiveness. The articles include Engineering Gap? Fact and Fiction, U.S. Schools Are Still Ahead—Way Ahead, and U.S. Schools: Not That Bad.

Wadhwa has argued that higher education is valuable. Alongside Henry Bienen, he debated Peter Thiel, who launched the Thiel Fellowship to provide $100,000 to students who dropped out of college to start up companies, on the merits of higher education. Wadhwa argued against Thiel and Charles Murray at an Intelligence Squared debate in Chicago that was broadcast on NPR stations. Wadhwa spoke on 60 Minutes "Dropping Out: Is College Worth the Cost?" and argued that basic college education is important and valuable because it teaches skills, including social skills and the skills to turn an idea into an invention and then into a company, and that those skills help individuals get ahead.

Wadhwa is named as a co-inventor on 4 patents: 6,389,588: "Method and system of business rule extraction from existing applications for integration into new applications", 6,346,953: "Method and system for recreating a user interface of an existing application text based user interface into a graphical user interface", 5,495,610: "Software distribution system to build and distribute a software release" and 5,295,222: "Computer-aided software engineering facility". He has argued that software patents should be abolished: "patents have become the greatest inhibitor to innovation and are holding the United States back."

In November 2012, Wadhwa discussed "Technology's Promise, Humanity's Future" with Nobel Laureate Ahmed Zewail at UCSB Campbell Hall in Isla Vista, California.

Wadhwa argues that this decade will be the most innovative in history, predicting that "today's technology is rapidly catching up to Star Trek" and that in the coming years, 3D printers will make it possible to synthetically produce meat and create an abundance of food, humans will eventually be banned from driving cars, and artificial intelligence will be able to be individual's personal medical assistants.

In 2013, Wadhwa debated Nobel Laureate Robert Shiller on "Goldman Vs. Google: A career on Wall Street or in Silicon Valley?" at The Economist's Buttonwood Gathering. Shiller argued, "When you study finance, you are studying how to make things happen, on a big scale, on a lasting scale. That has to matter more than getting into Google and programming some little gimmick." Wadhwa argue that "Google is changing the dynamics of cities, changing the dynamics of life" and that technology is enabling the world to be on the verge of solving "the grand challenges of humanity." Wadhwa posed this question: "Would you rather have your children engineering the financial system creating more problems for us, or having a chance of saving the world?" At the conclusion of the debate, "the audience voted heavily in favor of Mountain View and against Wall Street."

He appeared in the 2016 documentary The Future of Work and Death.

=== Startup Chile ===
Startup Chile is a government sponsored program that acts like a focused incubation program and attracts early-stage entrepreneurs to work on their startups. The program gives accepted entrepreneurs equity free seed funding, a work visa, office space, and access to mentors and global partnerships with organizations like Google, Amazon Web Services, Evernote, HubSpot and more. In addition to co-conceiving and helping create Startup Chile, Wadhwa serves as an unpaid advisor and consultant to the program.

In addition to co-conceiving and helping create Startup Chile, Wadhwa advised Spanish efforts to create their programs to attract entrepreneurs.

== Controversy and criticism ==
Wadhwa has publicly argued that Twitter is overly complacent about improving its diversity numbers. On the first occasion, he criticized Twitter for having an all-male board of directors. Twitter CEO Dick Costolo initially refused to comment, but then in a tweet, disparaged Wadhwa by likening him to "the Carrot Top of academic sources". Subsequently, Twitter appointed a woman, Marjorie Scardino, onto its board. On the second occasion, Wadhwa posted a series of tweets critical of Twitter's published diversity numbers (which included 90% of tech roles being filled by men) and the way in which Twitter had framed them, concluding that Twitter "is unrepentant and should be ashamed. Problems start from board and exec management. Must diversify".

Bitcoin Criticism

In January 2016 he wrote an article stating Bitcoin was dead.

=== Withdrawal from the societal debate on women in technology ===
In 2015, Wadhwa was criticized publicly by several women in technology for the way in which he was speaking on behalf of women in technology. One example mentioned was that at an event, he had used the slang word "floozies" when referring to technology companies needing to take hiring women more seriously, in the context of his advocacy for tech companies to include higher-ranking women on interview panels for female candidates. Wadhwa responded to the criticism by writing that he had not known what the word "floozy" meant due to his poor grasp of American slang, as an immigrant, that he had apologized at the event as soon as his misstep was pointed out to him, and that he had lost sleep over the ordeal.

The podcast TLDR, which is produced by an NPR affiliate, interviewed one of the critics, Amelia Greenhall, about a post she had recently written, entitled "Quiet, Ladies. @wadhwa is speaking now". Wadhwa published a response, alleging that several false claims were made in the original TLDR episode, and calling it an "unfair attack" on him. TLDR took down their original podcast episode and apologized for not speaking to Wadhwa about it before publication, and expressed regret for not fact-checking it. TLDR's next episode was a follow-up which gave Wadhwa a right of reply. However, Gawker's Jay Hathaway opined that "in the process of defending himself, Vivek Wadhwa ended up confirming much of what TL;DR asserted about his attitude".

On February 23, Wadhwa wrote an article in the Washington Post explaining why he would no longer participate in the debate on women in technology, writing, "I may have made the mistake of fighting the battles of women in technology for too long. And I may have taken the accusations too personally. Today there is a chorus of very powerful, intelligent, voices who are speaking from personal experience. The women who I have written about, who have lived the discrimination and abuse, as well as others, deserve the air time." The New York Times columnist Farhad Manjoo wrote a subsequent article entitled "An Outspoken Voice for Women in Tech, Foiled by His Tone" which summarized the imbroglio, and quoted Wadhwa and a number of women in technology in relation to it.

== Awards and honors ==
In 1999, Wadhwa was named a "leader of tomorrow" by Forbes magazine.

In February 2012, Wadhwa was one of the six "2012 Outstanding American by Choice" recipients, a distinction awarded by the United States Citizenship and Immigration Services.

In December 2012, Wadhwa was recognized by Foreign Policy magazine as a Top 100 Global Thinker.

In June 2013, Wadhwa was named to Time magazine's list of the Top 40 Most Influential Minds in Tech.

In September 2015, Financial Times named Wadhwa one of top ten men worth emulating in his support of women.

In May 2018, Silicon Valley Forum awarded Wadhwa its Visionary Award.
