= Vexel =

Type of raster art imitating vector graphics

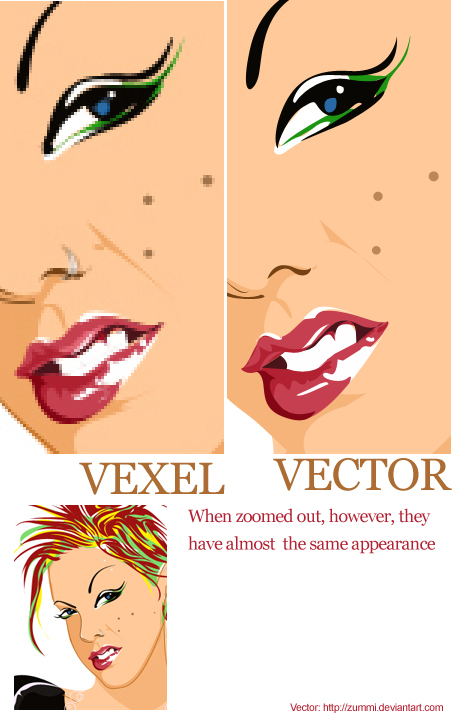
Difference between a Vexel and a Vector. Both are created using Adobe Photoshop or a similar application with the pen tool although the vector is made using the shape layer function of the pen tool whereas the vexel is based on raster layers.

Vexel is a neologism for an entirely pixel-based form of raster art that imitates the visual appearance of vector graphics technique (i.e. sharp-edged lines and areas of flat colour or smooth gradient fills). The word itself is a portmanteau derived from a combination of "vector" and "pixel."

== Technique ==
There is no one defined way to create a vexel, however, one archetypal way to create a vexel follows. Instead of using vector-based lines, shapes, and polygons to create an image, a vexel is typically created using a raster program's support for transparent layers. Each transparent layer is given a solid (or sometimes gradient) shape and a display ordering that when displayed together with other near shape layers appears to create a stepped-but-gradual color transition. In some cases, for more realism, gradients are used to remove the stepping in the color transitions to create a smoother, photo-realistic image.

The different nature of raster programs over a vector-plotted approach gives some vexel images a unique appearance when compared with traditional rasterized vector graphics. However, the increased flexibility comes with a loss of image scalability for print media, which vector artwork retains. To compensate for this, most vexels are created at very high resolution.

A vexel may even be composed using vector graphic techniques, however it becomes a vexel when the vector elements are rasterized and further manipulations to the image are done in raster. Sometimes true raster images are placed behind and/or in front of the original vector elements to emphasize the surrealism that the vector elements produce. A vexel is not essentially created with paintbrushes, airbrushes or a freehand tool such as pencil, although some may include these elements if they are not the primary medium. Ben Woolley says "[V]exels were originally meant to involve a vector technique, not any particular aesthetic style."

== Style and appearance ==
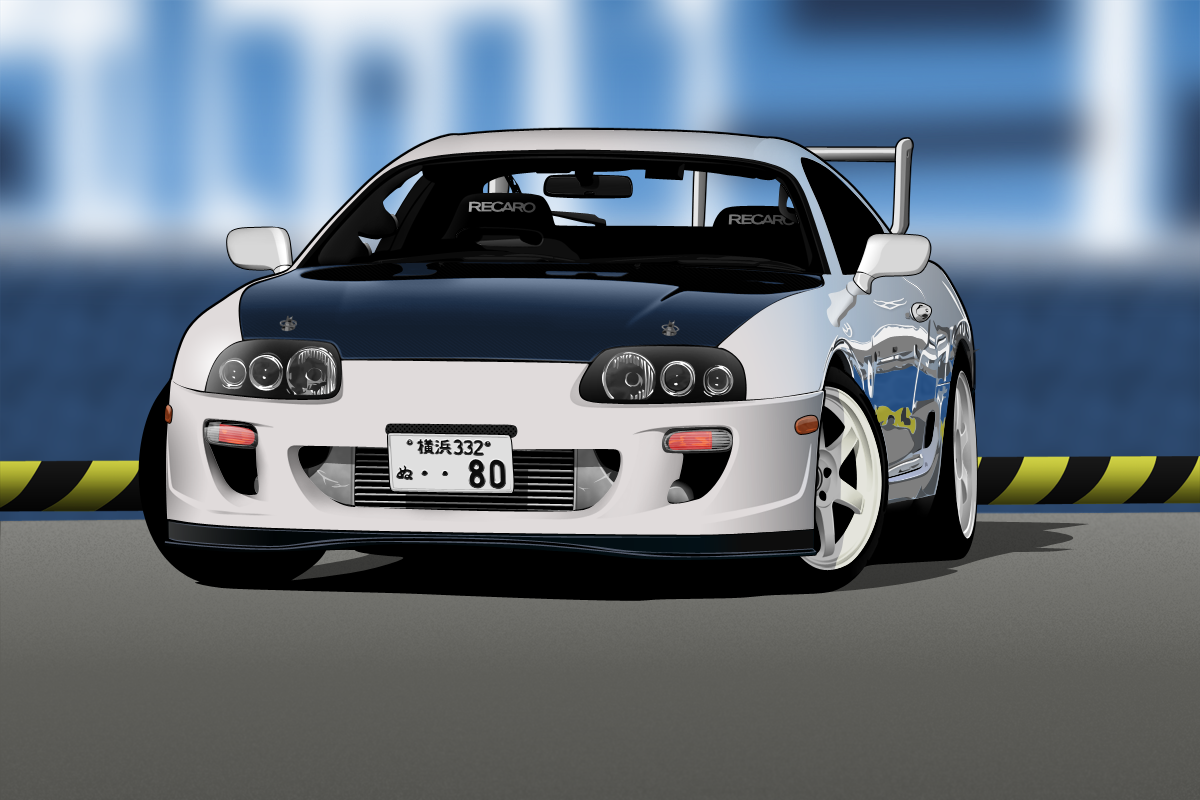
Vexels are commonly used to portray a sharpened look of a realistic object, such as a vehicle.

Vexels are often characterized by crisp, clean color and lines (that look nearly vector-graphics style) but is entirely pixel-based, with a variety of color levels, from 2-color outlines to pseudo-realism.

== Etymology ==
The term vexel was created by Seth Woolley while he was a technical contributor to the now defunct but once popular teen message board Nova Boards to give it a distinctive name from traditional vector graphics. Seth did not approve of calling the raster images that looked like vectors the name of "vector". In response to a question of what they would be called, he coined the term "vexel" as a combination of vector and pixel since they were not simply rasters, and those asking needed a name for a new style. He at first suggested calling them rasterized or posterized vector images, but the community took the word "vexel" as an acceptable neologism. Ben Woolley has described its derivation.
