= The Ellis School =

Prep school in Pittsburgh, Pennsylvania, US

Coordinates: 40.45417°N 79.91778°W

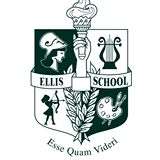
- Ellis School Crest

Location
- 6425 Fifth Avenue; Pittsburgh, Pennsylvania 15206; United States

Information
- Type: Independent college-preparatory school
- Motto: Latin: Esse Quam Videri (To be, rather than to seem)
- Established: 1916
- CEEB code: 393695
- NCES School ID: 01197832
- Head of school: Gary J. Niels
- Faculty: 67
- Grades: PK–12
- Gender: All-girls
- Enrollment: 373 (2020–2021)
- Average class size: 12
- Student to teacher ratio: 6:1
- Colors: White and hunter green
- Nickname: Tigers
- Accreditations: NAIS, PAIS, Pittsburgh Consortium of Independent Schools (PCIS), NCGS,
- Endowment: $32.09 million
- Annual tuition: $31,500 (11–12) $30,400 (9–10) $28,400 (7–8) $26,300 (5–6) $22,400 (1–4) $18,700 (K) $16,100 (PK)
- Revenue: $14.23 million
- Website: theellisschool.org

The Ellis School is an independent, all-girls, college-preparatory school located in the Shadyside section in the east end of Pittsburgh, Pennsylvania. The school serves girls aged 3 to grade 12.

== History ==
=== 20th century ===
When Pittsburgh's Pennsylvania College for Women closed its college-preparatory school, Dilworth Hall, Sara Ellis decided to start a proprietary school of her own by taking over a small institution, Miss Shaw's School. With three teachers and 41 students in kindergarten through twelfth grade, Miss Ellis' School opened in rented quarters at 4860 Ellsworth Avenue. Ellis and Marie Craighead continued as headmistress and assistant headmistress for 25 years. The school purchased the original property in 1933.

By 1939, enrollment had grown to more than 200 students, taught by a faculty of 27. Ellis applied for and was granted charter accreditation from the Middle States Association of Schools and Colleges in 1928, incorporated the school under a non-profit charter, and sold it to a self-perpetuating board of trustees in November 1929 as the Ellis School. That same year, Ellis merged with Miss Shearer's School and, in 1933, absorbed Miss Simonson's School, two small independent girls' schools in Pittsburgh.

When Ellis retired in 1941, she was succeeded by Harriet Sheldon from 1941 to 1944 and then by Marjorie L. Tilley from 1944 to 1955. In 1947, the school purchased the Ogden Edwards house at the corner of Fifth and South Negley Avenues, the Lazar house at 922 South Negley Avenue, and a vacant Lockhart property on Ivy Street. Enrollment increased to over 300. By 1955, the year of Tilley's retirement, there were temporary classrooms across the street at Third Presbyterian Church, Hunt Armory, and the East Liberty YWCA.

Marion Hope Hamilton became headmistress in 1955 and began searching for a new property. The school purchased the 5.1-acre site at 6425 Fifth Avenue, part of the estate of Charles and Thomas Arbuthnot, where it remains today. The groundbreaking ceremony took place in May 1958. There were two houses on the property, and the school razed one to make room for a new facility. The other house became the lower school for the next 30 years, and 116 lower school students moved into their quarters in late 1958.

The dedication of the buildings for the middle and upper schools took place in November 1959. Enrollment was 383, with a faculty of 39. In 1961, the school established a Cum Laude Society chapter.

Helen Mason Moore became headmistress in 1962 and served as headmistress until 1971. During her tenure, she created department heads. She consulted with them on academic policies, allowed seniors to complete independent study and senior projects, brought visiting speakers to the school for weekly assemblies, and opened the school's facilities to the community. Among other groups, the Pittsburgh Savoyards spent several years in residence at the Ellis School.

In 1969, the trustees decided to consider the advisability of coeducation at Ellis. In the fall of 1972, the board of trustees decided that Ellis would remain a single-sex school. Judith Cohen Callomon '54, retired upper school director and former acting head of school, recalled, "When the decision was announced in assembly, the girls responded en masse in one of those ear-splitting, bench-thumping ovations."

Janet Jacobs succeeded Helen Moore as headmistress in 1971. In 1974, Jacobs announced May mini-courses for the upper school. This "third semester" in the last few weeks of the school year offers more than 50 courses.

In 1977, the school instituted the Experimental Intellectual Program (EIP) to provide funds to teachers for courses, conferences, curriculum planning, and travel. The school began awarding one travel grant each year. In 1984, the school made the EIP permanent and renamed it the Janet Jacobs Enrichment Program (JEP).

In 1973, Ellis added an optional afternoon kindergarten session. The full-day session quickly filled and, within a few years, replaced the half-day kindergarten entirely. In 1985, the school introduced an extended daycare program for lower school students. Shortly after that, it expanded the program to include students from the middle school grades. The school occupied girls in the program from 3:15–5:45 pm with snacks, indoor and outdoor activities, homework, music, and art. In 1990, the Ellis faculty started the Fifth Avenue Family Child Care Center, located in the basement of Arbuthnot House. The center, incorporated and managed by the faculty, is a distinct entity.

In 1974, the board approved plans for adding studio space and a new audio-visual room to the Fine Arts Building. In 1975, Ellis embarked on a ten-year development program.

By 1980, the school had raised $3.5 million, resulting in an enlarged and renewed Babcock Library, which had grown from 4,000 to 33,000 volumes since 1961; a new science wing; additional Middle School facilities; a mini-gym; remodeled arts rooms; and new playgrounds. In 1980, the program's second phase, Development II, was launched. Goals included maintaining a low student-faculty ratio, keeping faculty salaries competitive, increasing population, and ensuring the proper upkeep of the physical plant. Development II aimed to boost the book value of the Ellis endowment from $2 million to $4 million and increase annual giving. Spurred by a challenge grant, annual giving climbed to $175,000 by the end of the 1981–82 fiscal year. Two years later, the endowment passed four million dollars.

The long-range development plan culminated in the building of a new lower school. The school required more extensive, up-to-date facilities to replace the Arbuthnot building. The school launched the Lower School Building and Endowment Campaign to secure funds. Construction was delayed due to negotiations with neighbors who protested that the school might encroach on their residential neighborhood.

Jacob retired in 1986, and Ellen E. Fleming, Ellis's new headmistress, arrived from Atlanta to oversee site preparation. By October 1987, more than three million dollars had been pledged to the campaign, and construction began on a pay-as-you-go basis. The Alice S. Beckwith Building, with a science lab, music room, and gym/activities room, was formally dedicated on April 15, 1988. Arbuthnot House became an administrative center, with offices for the head of school, development, alumnae affairs, admissions, and the business manager, as well as space for a lower school library and computer room. In addition, there were funds to enhance the endowment, whose book value at the end of the 1987–88 school year was $5.3 million.

Ellen Fleming resigned as head of school after four years. Helen Stevens Chinitz succeeded her and served for the 1990–91 school year. Following her resignation, Frances A. Koch, the upper school director, served as interim head of school for a year.

In 1992, a search committee selected Rebecca T. Upham as head of school. She began Symposia, which brought speakers such as columnist and writer Anna Quindlen, astronaut Sally Ride, researcher Carol Gilligan, and author Mary Pipher to address standing-room-only crowds.

In the mid-1990s, the school experienced record-breaking enrollment and a technology plan focused on integrating technology across the curriculum and including a wireless laptop program in grades 8–12. Ellis held a $9.7 million Capital Campaign, which contributed to the construction of the Upper School Hillman Family Building, an increase in the faculty endowment, a new alumnae hall, and a new athletic facility featuring a regulation-sized gymnasium, a climbing wall, and a training center.

=== 21st century ===
Upham departed at the end of the 2000–01 academic year to become a head of school in Boston. Judith Cohen Callomon, '54, took over as acting head of school for the 2001–02 school year.

Mary H. Grant, former assistant head and upper school director at the Springside School in Philadelphia, began as head of school on July 1, 2002. In her first year, Grant hosted Jehan Sadat, the widow of the late Egyptian president, as the Ellis Symposium speaker, and in 2006 hosted Michael Thompson, author and psychologist. Grant announced her retirement in 2008, and A. Randol Benedict, admissions director at the Garrison Forest School in Maryland, began as head of school in July 2009.

In 2012, Ellis had nearly 500 students, a faculty of 78, and an endowment of $25 million.

== School structure ==
=== Student support ===
Every new student is assigned a "big sister" or "class sister" to guide her through the transition period.

The Ellis Parents Association (EPA) supports the school through volunteer programs and fundraising efforts.

Members of the Ellis Alumnae Association, organized in 1919, volunteer as class agents, event hosts, guest speakers, and Ellis Magazine correspondents.

=== Faculty ===
Of the 67 faculty members at the Ellis School, 66% hold master's degrees.

Average class sizes at the Ellis School are:

- Pre-K and K: 8
- Lower School: 14
- Middle School: 15
- Upper School: 15

The student-to-computer ratio at the Ellis School is 1:1.

== Admissions ==
Total enrollment at the Ellis School is currently 373 students, aged 3 through grade 12. The student body represents 68 zip codes and 35 school districts. 38% of students are people of color. 35% of students receive need-based financial aid awards and scholarships. The school awarded $1.8 million in financial aid in 2013.

== Curriculum ==
The school bases the middle and upper schools on a ten-day cycle. Students participate in activities that provide access to community resources and partnerships every other cycle. There are division-wide co-curricular programs in the middle school. In contrast, the students are involved with numerous community programs at the upper school. The school offers an Extended Day Program to pre-K through 8th-grade students. Students who remain on campus after 3:30 and do not participate in extracurricular activities must enroll in this program. For lower school students, an After School Adventures Program offers young girls activities in areas such as creative arts, sciences, and athletics.

For pre-K, there are half-day and whole-day programs.

=== Experiential learning ===
Ellis School students engage in experiential learning, which requires students to apply knowledge to new experiences and hands-on activities.

==== Community Connections Program ====
The Community Connection program provides students in grades 9 to 11 with opportunities to engage in local community service. Faculty members and administrators choose placements.

==== Service learning ====
Service programs are optional. Opportunities include Afghan Sister School, Earth Cream Sale, Environmental Ambassadors, Guild, and Mitten Tree.

=== Global initiatives ===
Ellis School offers assembly speakers and special events, and a student-organized Culture Jam and diversity conference extended to students from other area high schools. Students may also take educational trips to various destinations around the world during March break or the mini-course session in May. Past trips included Costa Rica, Italy, Spain, and Russia.

== Notable alumnae ==
- Janice Burgess (Class of 1974), Television executive, screenwriter, and producer for Nickelodeon and creator of The Backyardigans cartoon series
- Annie Dillard, writer, Pulitzer Prize recipient
- Lucy Fato, corporate attorney, Executive Vice President & General Counsel for Seaport Entertainment Group
- Elsie Hillman (Class of 1943), philanthropist and a former Republican National Committeewoman
- Lani Lazzari, founder of Simple Sugars
- Amy Rosenzweig, biochemist, MacArthur Grant recipient

== Former Heads of School ==
Head	Tenure	Title
Sara Frazer Ellis	1916–1941	Founder and headmistress
Harriet S. Sheldon	1941–1944	Headmistress
Marjorie L. Tilley	1944–1955	Headmistress
Marion Hope Hamilton, PhD	1955–1962	Headmistress
Helen Mason Moore	1962–1971	Headmistress
Janet Jacobs	1971–1986	Headmistress
Ellen E. Fleming	1986–1990	Headmistress
Helen Stevens Chinitz	1990–1991	Headmistress
Frances Koch	1991–1992	Interim headmistress
Rebecca Upham	1992–2001	Head of school
Judith Cohen Callomon '54	2001–2002	Acting head of school
Mary H. Grant, PhD	2002–2009	Head of school
A. Randol Benedict	2009–2013	Head of school
Robin O. Newham	2013–2017	Head of school
Macon Paine Finley	2017–2024	Head of school
Tambi Tyler	2024-2025	Head of School
Gary J. Niels	2025-	Head of School
