= Lani Lazzari =

American entrepreneur and businessperson

- Born: Pittsburgh, Pennsylvania
- Education: The Ellis School
- Occupation(s): Entrepreneur, businesswoman
- Years active: 2005–present
- Website: www.simplesugarsskincare.com

Lani Lazzari is an American entrepreneur and businessperson, who is best known for founding the cosmetics company Simple Sugars, which she did when she was 11 years of age.

== Early life ==
Lani Lazzari was born in Pittsburgh, Pennsylvania to Gina Lazzari. and Donald Lazzari. She stated that she suffered from eczema when she was a child. Lazzari completed her high school education at The Ellis School and was accepted at George Washington University, but dropped out before attending. She was accepted into the Thiel Fellowship in 2017.

== Career ==
Lazzari had stated that she had strived to try to create a skin-care product to help cure her eczema after being unsatisfied with what the market had to offer. After finding her products worked, she then proceeded to start a small-business which she named "Simple Sugars" in 2005.

In 2013, Lazzari appeared on the American reality show Shark Tank where she sought an investor for Simple Sugars, a cosmetics company. She had Lori Greiner demo the product during her presentation. One of the sharks, Mark Cuban, made an offer at $100,000 for a 33 percent equity stake. Lazzari accepted the offer with Cuban. A year later, Lazzari appeared on Shark Tank once again for a business update. According to a report made by CNBC, as of 2018, Simple Sugars has grossed over $30,000,000.
