= Vector network =

Concept in vector graphics

Vector networks are a generalization of the idea of a drawing path in vector graphics programs that allows networks of points and links that have a generalized topology, rather than a single path. They are used in the commercial software package Figma. Early work on vector networks was done independently by Boris Dalstein as part of his PhD thesis.
