= Erin Smith (entrepreneur) =

American entrepreneur

- Born: 2000 (age 25–26); Lenexa, Kansas, U.S.
- Education: Stanford University
- Occupations: Entrepreneur, investor
- Known for: Founder of FacePrint
- Awards: Thiel Fellow, Davidson Fellow, Forbes 30 Under 30, EPO Young Inventors Prize (1st place)

Erin Smith is an American inventor and investor. She founded FacePrint, a medical technology venture focused on developing facial recognition software for assisting in the diagnosis of Parkinson's disease. In 2018, Smith was recognized as a Thiel Fellow, and in 2022, she was awarded the first place Young Inventors Prize by the European Patent Office.

== Biography ==
Erin Smith was raised in Lenexa, Kansas, a suburb of Kansas City. She has two older sisters and two younger brothers.

During high school, while watching a video interview of Michael J. Fox, who has been diagnosed with Parkinson's disease, she observed a distinct emotional distance in his facial expressions. She had also previously watched the show Lie To Me, which features a scientist character based on Paul Ekman, who studied facial expressions, which contributed to her interest in developing technology to detect Parkinson's by monitoring faces. Smith continued to watch more video interviews of people with Parkinson's and conducted her own research.

During a spring break from school, she conducted a study on people with Parkinson's and control subjects without Parkinson's. The study aimed to document both spontaneous expressions in response to videos and intentional expressions made by subjects attempting to mirror another face. She used the facial recognition software Affdex to help measure the results. She later received support from The Michael J. Fox Foundation for two additional pilot studies. One of these studies involved filming subjects with webcams as they watched Super Bowl commercials and tried to mirror the expressions of emoji.

In 2016, she participated in the BuiltByGirls Future Founder challenge at Twitter headquarters, where she emerged as the winner, securing a $10,000 prize to further her research and development of the app, as well as to apply for a full patent on her work. Additionally, Smith received mentoring from the University of Missouri–Kansas City Small Business & Technology Development Center for two years to transform FacePrint into a viable business.

In 2017, Smith was selected for the Research Science Institute summer program jointly sponsored by the Center for Excellence in Education and MIT. She graduated high school in 2018 and was accepted by Stanford University, but deferred admission to become a 2018 Thiel Fellow for two years. FacePrint began clinical trials in 2019 with Stanford Medical School and the Michael J. Fox Foundation.

As a student at Stanford University, Smith became an ambassador for the IF/THEN collective, an organization that seeks to support women in STEM careers.

In 2025, Smith joined the venture capital firm Parable as an investor.

== Awards and honors ==
- 2017 International BioGENEius Challenge
- 2018 Davidson Fellow
- 2018 Global Teen Leader
- 2018 Regeneron STS Scholar by the Society for Science and the Public
- 2018 Thiel Fellow
- 2019 Wired Top Health Startup
- 2019 Forbes 30 Under 30
- 2020 Voices of the Year, Seventeen Magazine
- 2022 European Patent Office Young Inventor Award, 1st place
