= Erin Elizabeth Smith =

American poet

Erin Elizabeth Smith is an American poet, editor, publisher, and educator.

== Biography ==
Smith, originally from Lexington, South Carolina, holds a B.A. in English from Binghamton University, an M.F.A. in Poetry from the University of Illinois, and a Ph.D. in Literature and Creative Writing from the University of Southern Mississippi. She currently teaches creative writing and literature at the University of Tennessee. She is the author of three full-length poetry collections and two chapbooks. Smith lives in Oak Ridge, Tennessee, where she serves as the Executive Director of the Sundress Academy for the Arts, a writers residency and arts collective.

In 1999, Smith founded Stirring: A Literary Collection, now one of the oldest continually-published literary journals on the internet. A year later, she founded Sundress Publications, a literary organization that publishes several online journals as well as chapbooks and full-length poetry collections in both print and electronic formats. In 2006, Smith founded the Best of the Net Anthology, also published by Sundress.

From 2022–2024, Smith served as the inaugural Poet Laureate for the City of Oak Ridge, TN.

== Bibliography ==
=== Poetry collections ===
- DOWN. Stephen F. Austin State University Press. 2020.
- The Naming of Strays. Gold Wake Press. 2011.
- The Fear of Being Found. Three Candles Press. 2008.

Chapbook

- Ghost Animal. Milk & Cake Press. 2023.
- The Chainsaw Bears. Dancing Girl Press. 2008.

== Reviews ==
- The Naming of Strays reviewed by Anne Barngrover
- The Naming of Strays reviewed by Karen J. Weyant
- The Fear of Being Found reviewed by Gary Charles Wilkens
- The Fear of Being Found reviewed by Wendy Whelan
