= List of Adobe Flash software =

The following is a list of notable software for creating, modifying and deploying Adobe Flash and Adobe Shockwave format.

== Playback ==
- Adobe Flash Player
- Adobe Flash Lite
- Adobe AIR
- Gnash
- Lightspark
- Ruffle
- Shumway
- Scaleform GFx
- Swfdec

== Authoring ==
"Authoring" in computing, is the act of creating a document, especially a multimedia document, hypertext or hypermedia.

- Adobe Flash Professional
- Adobe Flash Builder
- Adobe Flash Catalyst
- Adobe Flash Media Live Encoder
- Ajax Animator
- FlashDevelop
- Haxe
- Powerflasher FDT
- MTASC
- OpenFL
- OpenLaszlo
- Print2Flash
- Qflash
- SWFTools
- swfmill
- SWiSH Max
- Stencyl

== Compilers ==
- Adobe Flash Professional
- Apache Flex
- CrossBridge
- Google Swiffy
- SWFTools
- swfmill

== Debuggers and profilers ==
- Adobe Scout
- FlashFirebug

== Libraries ==
- Ming
- SWFAddress
- SWFObject
  - SWFFit
- Papervision3D
- Stage3D
  - Away3D
  - Flare3D
  - Starling

== Server software ==
- Adobe Flash Media Server

== See also ==
- Flash for Linux
