= OpenFL =

Software framework for video games

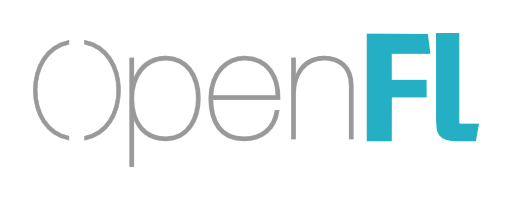

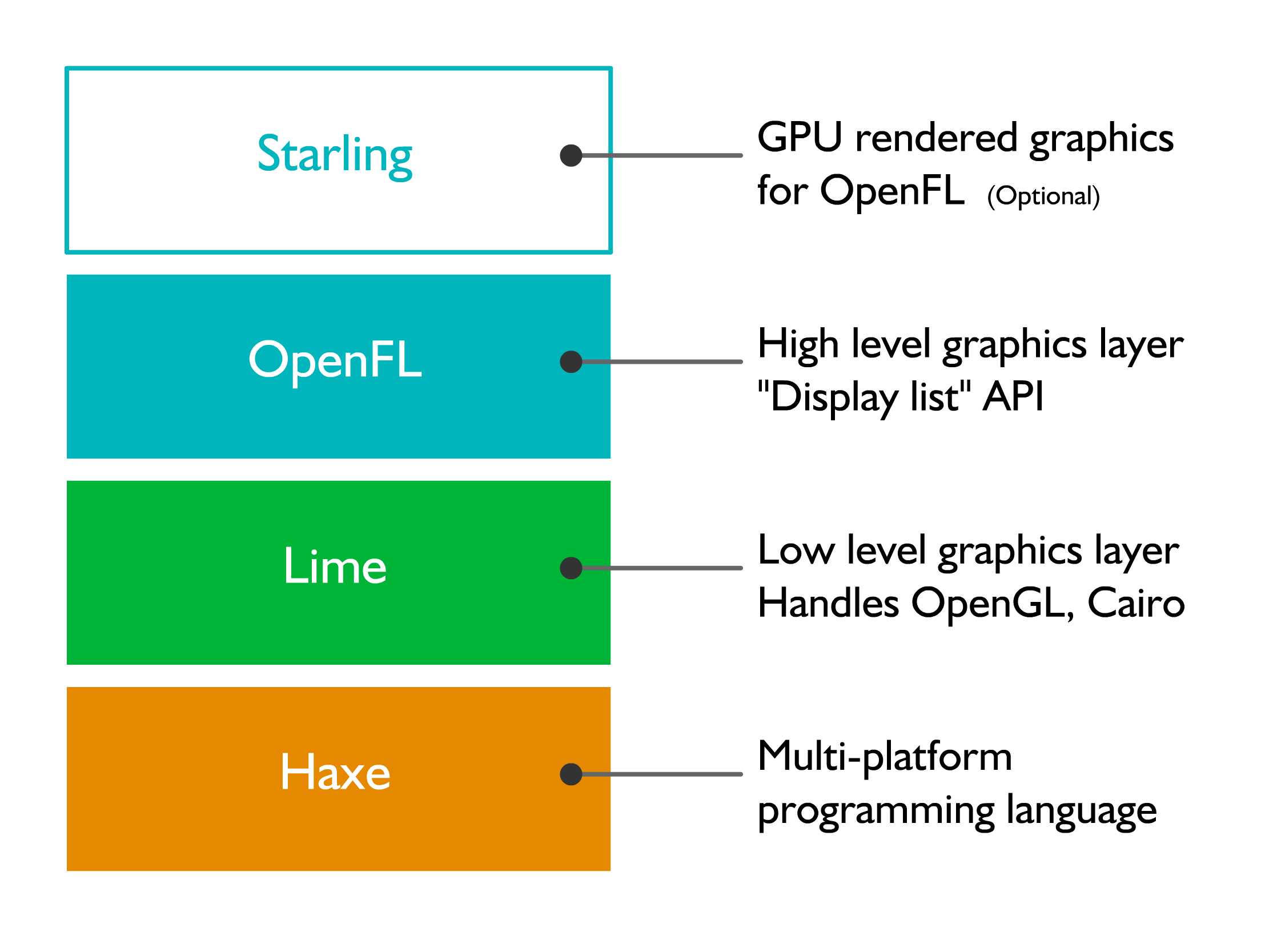
- Developer(s): OpenFL Contributors
- Initial release: 30 May 2013; 12 years ago
- Stable release: 9.4.1 / 19 December 2024; 7 months ago
- Repository: github.com/openfl/openfl
- Written in: Haxe
- Operating system: Microsoft Windows, macOS, Linux
- Platform: Microsoft Windows, macOS, Linux, iOS, Android, Flash Player, HTML5
- Type: Software framework
- License: MIT License
- Website: www.openfl.org

OpenFL is a free and open-source software framework and platform for the creation of multi-platform applications and video games. OpenFL applications can be written in Haxe, JavaScript (EcmaScript 5 or 6+), or TypeScript, and may be published as standalone applications for several targets including iOS, Android, HTML5 (choice of Canvas, WebGL, SVG or DOM), Windows, macOS, Linux, WebAssembly, Flash, AIR, PlayStation 4, PlayStation 3, PlayStation Vita, Xbox One, Wii U, TiVo, Raspberry Pi, and Node.js.

The most popular editors used for Haxe and OpenFL development are:

- Visual Studio Code (with plugin)
- HaxeDevelop (supports code folding, code refactoring and interactive debugging)
- Sublime Text (with plugin)
- IntelliJ IDEA (with plugin)

OpenFL contains Haxe ports of major graphical libraries such as Away3D, Starling, Babylon.js, Adobe Flash and DragonBones. Due to the multi-platform nature of OpenFL, such libraries usually run on multiple platforms such as HTML5, Adobe AIR and Android/iOS.

More than 500 video games have been developed with OpenFL, including Papers, Please, Rymdkapsel, Lightbot, Friday Night Funkin', and Madden NFL Mobile.

OpenFL was created by Joshua Granick and is currently administered and maintained by Chris Speciale, software engineer, board member, and co-owner.

== Technical details ==
=== OpenFL ===
OpenFL is designed to fully mirror the Flash API. SWF files created with Adobe Flash Professional or other authoring tools may be used in OpenFL programs.

OpenFL supports rendering in OpenGL, Cairo, Canvas, SVG and even HTML5 DOM. In the browser, WebGL is the default renderer but if unavailable then canvas (CPU rendering) is used. Certain features (shape.graphics or bitmapData.draw) will use CPU rendering, but the display list remains GPU accelerated as far as possible.

=== Lime ===
OpenFL uses the Lime library for low-level rendering. Lime provides hardware-accelerated rendering of vector graphics on all supported platforms.

Lime is a library designed to provide a consistent "blank canvas" environment on all supported targets, including Flash Player, HTML5, Microsoft Windows, macOS, Linux, iOS, Android, consoles, set-top boxes and other systems. Lime is a cross-platform graphics, sound, input and windowing library, which means OpenFL can focus on being a Flash API, and not handling all these specifics. Lime also includes command-line tools.

=== Haxe ===
Haxe is a high-level cross-platform multi-paradigm programming language and compiler that can produce applications and source code, for many different computing platforms, from one code-base. It is free and open-source software, distributed under the GNU General Public License (GPL) 2.0, and the standard library under the MIT License.

Haxe includes a set of common functions that are supported across all platforms, such as numeric data types, text, arrays, binary and some common file formats. Haxe also includes platform-specific application programming interface (API) for Adobe Flash, C++, PHP and other languages.

Haxe originated with the idea of supporting client-side and server-side programming in one language, and simplifying the communication logic between them. Code written in the Haxe language can be source-to-source compiled into ActionScript 3, JavaScript, Java, C++, C#, PHP, Python, Lua and Node.js. Haxe can also directly compile SWF, HashLink and NekoVM bytecode.

=== Starling ===
The Haxe port of the Starling Framework runs on Stage3D and supports GPU-accelerated rendering of vector graphics. It uses a custom Stage3D implementation, and does not require the OpenFL display list to work.

== See also ==
- Haxe
- Adobe AIR
