= Powerflasher FDT =

- Home screen of FDT 4.5 running on Mac OS X
- Developer: Powerflasher Solutions
- Stable release: Milestone 10 / September 15, 2017; 8 years ago;
- Written in: Java
- Operating system: Windows, macOS, Linux
- Type: Integrated development environment
- License: Freemium
- Website: fdt.powerflasher.com

Powerflasher FDT is an integrated development environment (IDE) built on the Eclipse platform for development of Adobe Flash-based content.

FDT enables development of content such as video games, rich web applications and Adobe AIR applications, in the ActionScript 3 and Haxe programming languages. FDT offers project management, code editing and interactive debugging. FDT is similar in purpose and design to Adobe Flash Builder and FlashDevelop. The primary purpose of the IDE is enabling developers to edit, compile, debug and publish a Flash ActionScript project.

FDT uses a subscription-based licensing model and is available in multiple editions, including a free version with restricted features for hobbyists, and a low-cost version for students.

== Features ==
FDT supports the following code editing features:

- Syntax highlighting
- Code completion
- Code snippets (entitled "Code templates")
- Code refactoring (renaming and moving members)
- Suggested Fixes (entitled "Quick Fixes")
- Navigate to Declaration
- Find All References
- Organize Imports

FDT supports building applications for the following runtimes:

- Adobe Flash Player
- Adobe AIR
- NekoVM

FDT supports compiling source code with the following compilers:

- Adobe Flex SDK
- Adobe AIR SDK
- Haxe SDK

== See also ==
- List of Eclipse-based software
