= Papervision3D =

3D engine for Adobe Flash

- Original author: Carlos Ulloa
- Initial release: December 2005; 19 years ago
- Final release: 2.1.932 / December 2009; 15 years ago
- Operating system: OS independent
- Type: Flash 3D engine
- License: MIT License
- Website: code.google.com/p/papervision3d/

Papervision3D is an open-source, 3D graphics engine for rendering 3D content within Adobe Flash Player and Adobe AIR.

Unlike modern Flash 3D engines such as Away3D and Flare3D, Papervision3D is not built for Stage3D and renders 3D content fully on the CPU without GPU-accelerated rendering.

== History ==
Papervision3D was launched by Carlos Ulloa around December 2005; it was made open source by the end of 2006. Papervision3D was of the first 3D rendering engines built for Adobe Flash Player, and at the time of its launch in 2005, was the most complete and best known 3D engine for Flash. It used drawTriangles() to render 3D content fully on the CPU, within Flash Player.

According to a 2009 book Papervision3D was "without a doubt the best known" 3D engine for Flash. A 2012 book called it the "granddaddy of 3D libraries for Flash" and argued that "There is a simple reason for PaperVision3D's popularity: it is very complete in its execution."

Away3D was forked from Papervision3D, for the purpose of improving performance. Another 2011 book noted in the section on "3D with Flash" that "Away3D and Alternativa3D are currently the preferred solution for performance and features because they have a more active development community".

Papervision3D was popular between its introduction in 2006 and 2009, but development has stopped since 2009 and it has been superseded by Away3D, which has been adopted by Adobe as the sole 3D rendering engine included within the official Adobe Gaming SDK.

== See also ==
- Stage3D
- WebGL
