= Flare3D =

Development software

- Flare3D IDE with viewport (center), object properties (top right), and texture panel
- Developers: Flare3D (Ariel Nehmad, Adrian Simonovich, Jose Luis Ressia)
- Stable release: 2.7.1 / February 12, 2014; 11 years ago
- Written in: ActionScript 3
- Operating system: Web, Windows, iOS, Android, BlackBerry
- Type: Content creation system
- License: Proprietary
- Website: flare3d.com

Flare3D is a framework for developing interactive three-dimensional (3D) graphics within Adobe Flash Player, Adobe Substance and Adobe AIR, written in ActionScript 3. Flare3D includes a 3D object editor (the Flare3D IDE) and a 3D graphics engine for rendering 3D graphics. Flare3D runs on current web browsers utilizing the Adobe Flash Player, and uses Stage3D for GPU-accelerated rendering. Flare3D has not been under active development since late 2014.

Flare3D has been used to develop popular browser-based video games such as FarmVille 2 and CityVille 2. Flare3D is one of the first frameworks to make GPU-accelerated 3D applications practical for web browsers, and is similar in purpose and design to Away3D. Flare3D has been used to create 3D models in online applications, such as Space Designer 3D.

The Flare3D platform consists of a 3D world editor, a runtime engine, and a collection of plug-ins for various applications.

The 3D editor may be used to lay out 3D objects, and to generate compressed Flare3D binary packages of 3D models. Such 3D models and animations may be imported from third-party programs such as Autodesk 3ds Max, or Autodesk Maya, or other mesh-based 3D modeller. The 3D runtime engine is typically supplied as a closed-source SWC package, although small portions are released on the GitHub open-source website.

The Flare3D engine uses Stage3D for GPU-accelerated rendering, and contains support for rigid body physics, skeletal animations, and a proprietary GPU-shader language known as FLSL (Flare3D Shader Language). The engine also integrates with FLARToolkit (for augmented reality), Away Physics (from Away3D) and Starling (an Adobe project).

The Flare3D plug-in for Autodesk 3ds Max is provided for free, and enables one-click exporting of a 3D model from 3ds Max to the Flare3D file format. Animation data is also exported, for "Hierarchical" and "Skinned"-based animations. Texture data is automatically converted from unsupported formats to JPG and PNG formats which are supported by the Flare3D engine.

Flare3D has online help and a collaboratively-edited Wiki, forums, tutorials, examples, and documentation.

== List of games ==
Flare3D is used in a number of commercial browser-based Flash video games.

- Dimensional Drift (by Cartoon Network)
- NetGuys (by Vodafone)
- CityVille 2 (by Zynga)
- FarmVille 2 (by Zynga)
- Chase Life (by Maruti Suzuki, ad advergame for the Alto K10)
- Heroica Fortraan (by Lego)
- Monster Fighters (by Lego)
- Sherwood Dungeon (a 3D MMORPG)
