= Pocket Fleet =

2012 video game

Pocket Fleet Multiplayer
- Developers: Tolga Özuygur and Cem Uzunoğlu
- Publisher: Overdose Caffeine Games
- Platforms: Adobe Flash, iPhone, iPod Touch, Android
- Release: September 2012
- Genre: MOBA

Pocket Fleet is a space themed MOBA game developed by Turkish studio 'Overdose Caffeine Games'. The Android version was released in September 2012. followed by iOS and Flash versions. An Ouya port was also planned initially but abandoned due to porting difficulties. The game features arena type PvP and PvE game play using Asteroids-like game mechanics.

== Gameplay ==
In Pocket Fleet the player controls a fighter class spaceship. Spaceships have upgradable cannons and missile weapons. The game is played over the Internet against other players. There are a variety of game modes including Team match, Capture the Orb, Dogfight, Aerie Invasion and beginners match. In some modes holding or defending an orb is the primary goal, where in others it is simply to obtain the most frags.

For all game modes, the basic objective is to kill enemy players and destroy the enemy mothership. Before launching from mothership, the player is presented with a large arsenal of weapons and ships to choose from withinin a certain level of your account. Player's ship has a limited energy which is used to operate the thruster and weapons. Players can dock into the mothership any time to change their ship and weapon choices and to replenish their shield and energy. Cannons and missiles are the two main classes of weapons. Cannons have high fire rates and they move in a straight line, while missiles have the ability to lock on and home in on targets. Dying enemies drop powerups that replenish energy and shield. Upon death players wait for short time before respawning on the mothership. Players can also chat with each other on a global chat room or with other players on the same game room.

The game has a selection of tilt and virtual joystick controls with onscreen buttons on mobile platforms, and keyboard control on web.

== The Story ==
In Pocket Fleet the Earth is overpopulated. Humans build three spaceships to go in search of a new planet that is suitable for human habitation. A thousand years after their departure the population of Earth believes the ships are just a myth. When the ships finally return one has become the "Omnitron" in which the crew have downloaded their brain into robotic hosts as the next logical step in the evolution of the human race. Another spaceship has merged itself with local alien life forms, became a hive-mind and now calls itself "Aerie". The humans left on the earth labelled themselves "Incorruptus" to point to the unmodified nature of theirs and to the fact that the newly arrived races are abominations which can no longer considered to be human.

== Reception ==
The game has 500.000+ downloads and an average rating of 4.5 stars out of 5 on Google Play, and a 4.5 star rating out of 5 on iTunes store. Jeremiah Rice from AndroidPolice called it "a simple game with an addictive quality that's enhanced by the multiplayer team aspect" and gave it a score of 4.5 out of 5.

== Development ==
Pocket Fleet was developed with ActionScript 3.0, on the Adobe Flash Professional CS6 platform. The physics of the game is based on the Bean Grinder Game Engine. The multiplayer infrastructure is running on Coffee Pack, a multiplayer game development framework. The server-side infrastructure is a game server programmed with Java called LOPP (Low Orbit Press Pot). The game has a single code base and cross-compiled to multiple platforms by using the Adobe AIR technology. Various Adobe technologies such as Adobe Scout is also used during the development.
