= Friday Night Funkin' =

Upcoming video game

- Developer: The Funkin' Crew Inc.
- Publisher: The Funkin' Crew Inc. (Note: The Funkin' Crew published the mobile port on the Google Play Store and Apple App Store. ninjamuffin99 published the web build on Newgrounds and itch.io.)
- Director: PhantomArcade
- Producers: Hundrec; AbnormalPoof
- Designers: PhantomArcade; ninjamuffin99; Spazkid; fabs
- Programmers: ninjamuffin99; EliteMasterEric; fabs; KadeDev
- Artists: PhantomArcade; evilsk8r; brekkist
- Writer: PhantomArcade
- Composers: Kawai Sprite; Saruky
- Engine: HaxeFlixel (OpenFL, Haxe)
- Platforms: Browser; Windows; macOS; Linux; iOS; Android
- Release: TBA
- Genre: Rhythm
- Mode: Single-player

Friday Night Funkin' is an upcoming rhythm video game developed by the Funkin' Crew Inc. It revolves around the player character, Boyfriend, who must defeat a variety of opponents in singing and rapping contests in order to continue dating his love interest, Girlfriend. Gameplay involves hitting notes with timed inputs while avoiding running out of health for the duration of the song. There are currently ten levels, alongside selected songs featuring more difficult remixes. The game is also open-source. (Note: Friday Night Funkin' is licensed under the Apache License 2.0, per the game's license file. The repository's readme file used to state, "IF YOU MAKE A MOD AND DISTRIBUTE A MODIFIED / RECOMPILED VERSION, YOU MUST OPEN SOURCE YOUR MOD AS WELL", implying a copyleft requirement. From May to August 2021, the license file simply stated "if u make mods, open source them, lol!"; the Apache License 2.0 was used prior to May. In a tweet, ninjamuffin99 stated that it gets "iffy" when non-code assets are used commercially. From January 2023 to April 2024, the license file simply read "SORTING OUT LICENSE STUFF!!! BRB LOL!". In May 2024, the license was changed back to the Apache License 2.0, with the assets under a separate, closed license.)

Friday Night Funkin' was initially created by Cameron "ninjamuffin99" Taylor, David "PhantomArcade" Brown, Isaac "Kawai Sprite" Garcia, and the pseudonymous evilsk8r for the Ludum Dare 47 game jam, released on itch.io on October 5, 2020. An expanded demo was released on both itch.io and Newgrounds on November 1, 2020, with updates semi-continually released in the following years. The demo was also released for iOS and Android on July 15, 2025. A full version backed by Kickstarter, titled Friday Night Funkin': The Full Ass Game, is in development.

== Gameplay ==
The player controls a character called Boyfriend, who must defeat a series of opponents to continue dating his significant other, Girlfriend. The player must beat multiple levels, referred to as "Weeks" in-game, containing three songs each. Each week, the player faces a different opponent. During gameplay, the opponent will sing a pattern of notes represented as arrows, which the player must then mirror by using their set keybinds; by default the arrow keys (↑, ↓, ←, →), and optionally W, A, S, and D keys. This is done for the duration of the song while avoiding running out of health.

Gameplay of the fifth Week

For each week, the player has the option to select one of three difficulties: Easy, Normal, or Hard. As the difficulty increases, the speed of incoming arrows increases, and the patterns of arrows become more complex. The player's high score for each week on each difficulty is tracked and shown in the top corner of the week selection screen. Friday Night Funkin' contains two different modes of play: a story campaign in which songs are played linearly, and a "freeplay" mode which allows for free selection of any of the music tracks. Selected songs also have harder remixes under the "Erect" and "Nightmare" difficulties.

== Development ==
On October 3, 2020, video game programmer Cameron "ninjamuffin99" Taylor joined the Ludum Dare 47 game jam. Although the game jam's theme was "stuck in a loop", Taylor wanted to create a rhythm game inspired by multiple PlayStation titles, most notably PaRappa the Rapper and Gitaroo Man. (Note: ninjamuffin99. "Friday Night Funkin' is out, and what's next". Newgrounds.) Taylor contacted musician Isaac "Kawai Sprite" Garcia for a soundtrack and, after reaching out to various artists, was able to recruit pseudonymous artist evilsk8r and animator David "PhantomArcade" Brown for the project as well. Brown created the game's story—which was loosely inspired by former dating experiences—and collaborated with evilsk8r on the game's artwork and character design, while handling all the animations. Garcia based the game's songs on PaRappa the Rapper, while the characters' voices drew inspiration from Vib-Ribbon.

The team released the first version of Friday Night Funkin' on October 5, 2020. This version would become known as Friday Night Funkin' (Ludum Dare Prototype). Although this initial prototype did not perform well at the game jam, Taylor and the rest of the crew had plans to continue expanding the game. They reworked and improved the game with more songs and menus, and the first version of the demo was released on both Newgrounds and itch.io on November 1, 2020.

The Week 7 level was released as a timed exclusive on Newgrounds. Due to the increase in traffic on Newgrounds, the site crashed. Following the release of Week 7, the developers shifted focus to the full game, titled Friday Night Funkin': The Full Ass Game. The game's soundtrack has been made available on Bandcamp and Spotify.

After the release of Week 7, there would be a 3-year hiatus of updates until April 30, 2024, when new updates would again be released semi-consistently, including a new Story Mode level, multiple remixes of previous songs, a mobile release for both iOS and Android devices, and a level collaboration with K-pop group Le Sserafim and their single "Spaghetti".

=== Kickstarter crowdfunding ===
In April 2021, the developers announced plans to launch a Kickstarter project later in the month to turn the demo into a full game. On April 18, a Kickstarter project for the full version of Friday Night Funkin' was released, and reached its goal of $60,000 within hours. The Kickstarter ultimately raised over $2 million. In February 2022, IGN reported that Friday Night Funkin': The Full Ass Game was one of the most funded Kickstarter projects of 2021. The full game was projected to feature a mobile port, more challenging remixes of the standard soundtrack, online multiplayer functionality, and several additional levels. Some of these plans have been introduced in the current demo of the game.

== Reception ==
Friday Night Funkin' has an active modding community due to its open-source release, allowing for the easy implementation of fan-made content. As a result, the full game received mod support using the Polymod framework. TechRaptor noted Friday Night Funkin' shares some gameplay features with Dance Dance Revolution, PaRappa the Rapper, and the "Dance Contest" minigame from Club Penguin, and borrows aesthetic influences from early Flash games. The game has been credited with driving users back to Newgrounds, a site that rose in popularity in the early 2000s.

== Other media ==
A Friday Night Funkin'-themed DLC was added to the rhythm video game Rift of the NecroDancer on December 10, 2025.
