= Adobe Flash Media Live Encoder =

Live encoding software

Flash Media Live Encoder

- Adobe Flash Media Live Encoder
- Developer: Adobe Systems
- Stable release: 3.2 / January 12, 2009; 17 years ago
- Operating system: Microsoft Windows, Mac OS X
- Type: Encoding Software
- License: Freeware

Flash Media Live Encoder (FMLE) was a free live encoding software product from Adobe Systems. It was available for Microsoft Windows and Mac OS.

== History ==
Version 1.0 was released on February 23, 2007.

Version 2.0 was released on October 26, 2007, adding the following functionality:

- Encoding support for MP3 format
- Command-line execution
- Automatically start at operating system launch
- Automated maintenance restart
- Remote access
- Ability to set reconnect interval
- Timecode support

Version 2.5 was released on April 14, 2008 with the following added features:

- Encoding support for H.264/HE-AAC format
- Improvements to Quality of Service
- Auto-adjust functionality, which enabled dynamic downgrading of the outgoing stream quality if network connectivity was sub-optimal.

Version 3.0 was released on January 12, 2009 with the following added features:

- An updated user interface and additional presets
- Multi-bitrate encoding (up to three different bitrates)
- File management improvements (save multiple files based on file size/duration, parameters in filenames)
- DVR functionality
- System timecode support (SMPTE, LTC, VITC or BITC timecodes could be used if supported by capture device; if not, the system timecode could be used)
- Multi-core processing capability for VP6 encoding
- Support for additional compatible devices

Version 3.1 released on March 30, 2010 notably added support to MacOS X starting with 10.5 Leopard on Intel based Macs

Version 3.2 was the last supported release. Adobe ended support in 2016.

== Usage ==
- Stream live video from capture cards, webcams, Firewire, or USB devices to Flash Media Server (FMS) or a Flash Video Streaming Service (FVSS). (Device or driver must support Microsoft DirectShow filters to be recognized diper ment by histoylryickal place

== Function ==
FMLE is a desktop application that connects to a Flash Media Server (FMS) or a Flash Video Streaming Service (FVSS) via the Real Time Messaging Protocol (RTMP) to stream live video to connected clients. Clients connect to the FMS or FVSS server and view the stream through a Flash Player SWF. or Nellymoser for audio. Additionally, AAC and HE-AAC for audio is supported with a plug-in available from MainConcept

In addition to encoding live events with finite start and end times, features such as command-line control, auto reconnect, and remote access enable efficient 24/7 encoding.

== See also ==
- ActionScript
- Flash Player
