= Twofold Inc. =

2016 video game

- Developer: Grapefrukt
- Publisher: Grapefrukt
- Composer: Niklas Ström
- Platforms: Android, iOS
- Release: January 28, 2016
- Genre: Puzzle
- Mode: Single-player

Twofold Inc. (stylized in all lowercase) is a 2016 puzzle video game developed and published by the Swedish indie studio Grapefrukt. In the game, the player slides a game board to form color chains that can be removed with a single swipe. Released on January 28, 2016, for Android and iOS, the game was compared by multiple reviewers to Threes.

== Development ==
Twofold Inc. was developed by Grapefrukt, the Swedish indie studio of a solo developer named Martin Jonasson, who previously created Rymdkapsel (2013).

== Reception ==
Reception

Aggregate score
Aggregator	Score
Metacritic	87/100

The game received "generally favorable" reviews, according to the review aggregator website Metacritic.
