= Lightbot =

2008 educational video game

- Developer: Lightbot Inc.
- Publisher: Brad from code.org
- Designer: Danny Yaroslavski
- Engine: OpenFL
- Platforms: Web, Android, iOS
- Release: 2008
- Genre: Educational

Lightbot is an educational video game for learning software programming concepts, developed by Danny Yaroslavski. Lightbot has been played 7 million times, and is highly rated on iTunes and Google Play store. Lightbot is available as an online Flash game, and an application for Android and iOS mobile phones. Lightbot has been built with Flash and OpenFL.

A screenshot of Lightbot with robot (center) and command panel (right)

The goal of Lightbot is to command a little robot to navigate a maze and turn on lights. Players arrange symbols on the screen to command the robot to walk, turn, jump, switch on a light and so on. The maze and the list of symbols become more complicated as the lessons progress. While using such commands, players learn programming concepts like loops, procedures and more, without entering code in any programming language.

== See also ==
- Colobot
