= Rymdkapsel =

2013 video game

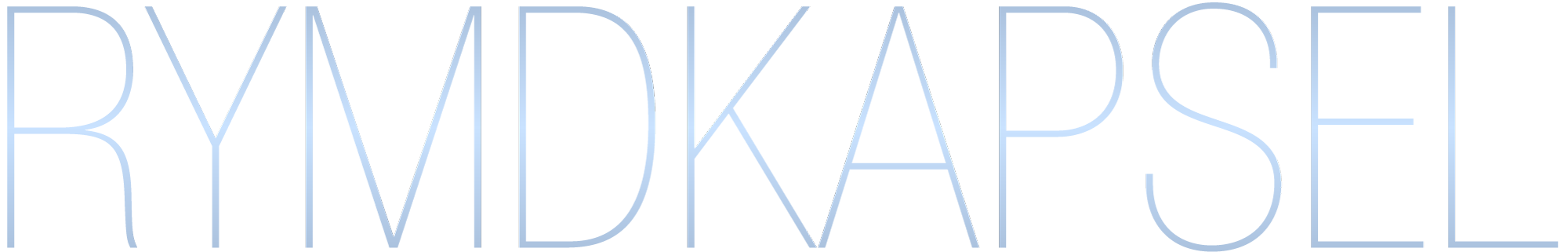
- Developer: Grapefrukt
- Publisher: Grapefrukt
- Programmer: Martin Jonasson
- Composer: Niklas Ström
- Engine: Adobe Flash
- Platforms: PlayStation Mobile, PlayStation Vita, iOS, Android, Microsoft Windows, OS X, Linux
- Release: PlayStation Mobile and Vita; May 7, 2013 iOS and Android; August 1, 2013; Windows, OS X, Linux; January 30, 2014
- Genre: Real-time strategy
- Mode: Single-player

Rymdkapsel is a 2013 minimalist real-time strategy video game by indie developer Grapefrukt, the studio of Martin Jonasson. Players build a space station using tetromino pieces while managing resources and minions, defending against attacks, and extending the base towards four monoliths at the edges of the level. The game was built over a year and a half and was inspired by the base-building aspects of the Command & Conquer series. It was Jonasson's first full game as an indie developer. Rymdkapsel was released on May 7, 2013, for PlayStation Mobile, and was later ported to iOS, Android, Microsoft Windows, OS X, and Linux. Reviewers gave the game generally favorable reviews, where they appreciated its simplicity and challenge, but not its brevity and slow start.

== Gameplay ==
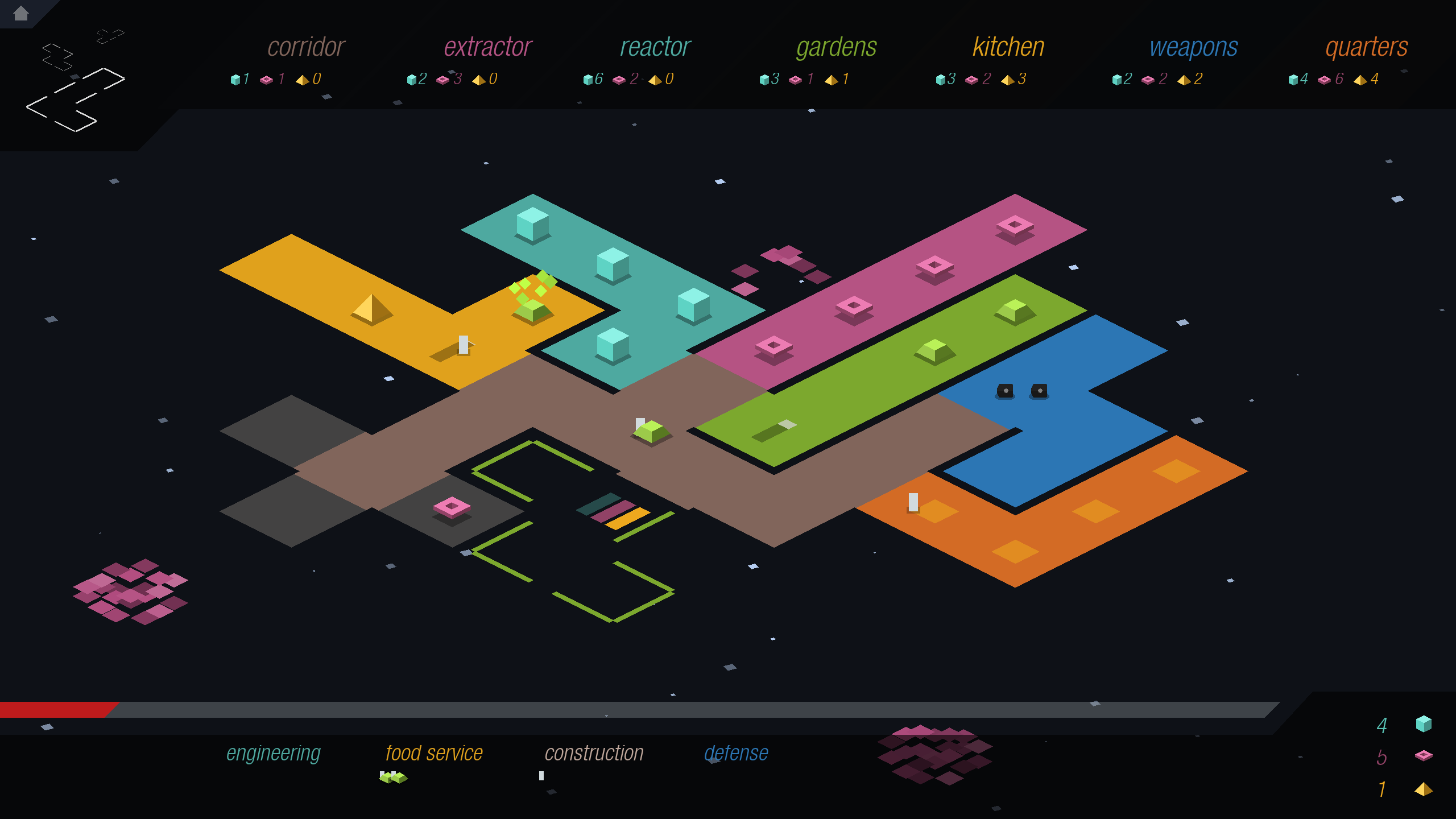
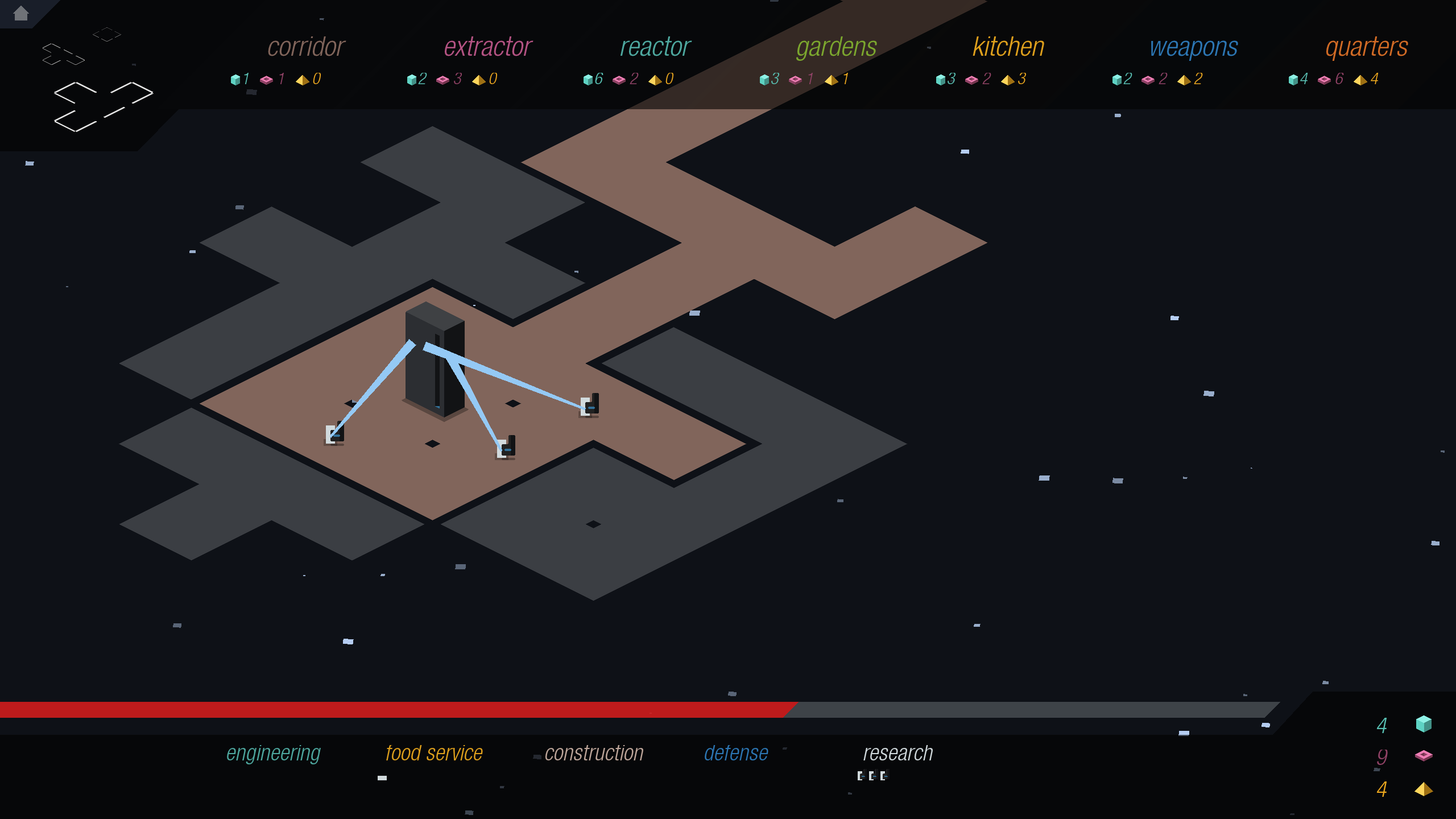
Screenshots of basic gameplay and workers researching the monolith

Players build a space station on a flat plane using tetromino-shaped floors that represent rooms. Rectangular workers generate the resources to build more spaces by working in these rooms. The workers occasionally must defend the base against attackers, who come in waves of increasing difficulty. The player can have the workers research four TMA-1-style monoliths for additional shield, speed, and generator upgrades. Rooms are used for special purposes: mineral mining (extractors), growing food (gardens), cooking it (kitchens), making workers (quarters), and creating power (reactors). The goal is to flourish and protect the station's inhabitants, but there are three concrete objectives: research all four monoliths, survive 28 waves, and research all monoliths in under 45 minutes. The game ends if all workers are killed. There is a tutorial, but no story. The player is not specifically told about the endgame goals.

== Development ==
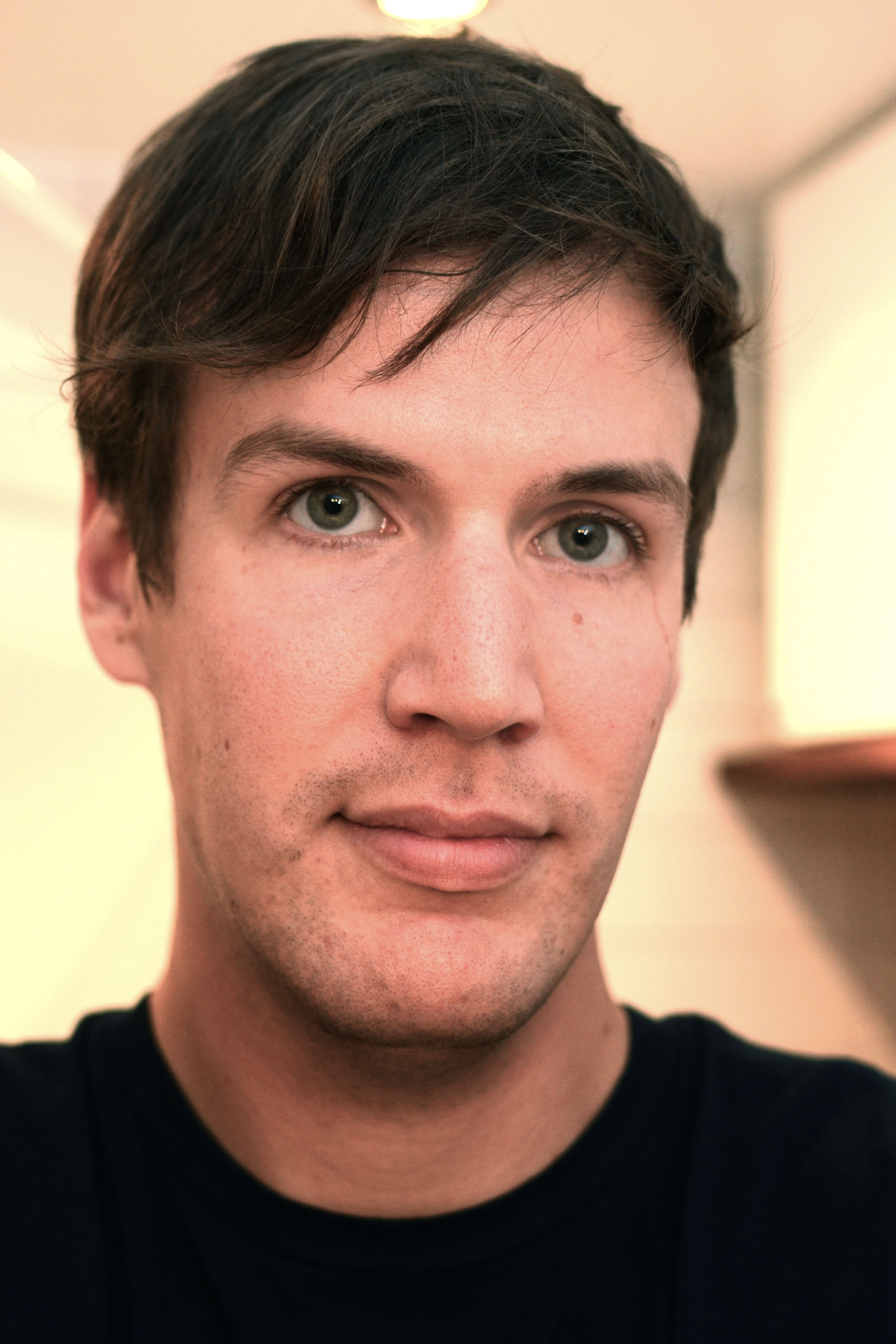
Developer Martin Jonasson

In 2012, Grapefrukt developer Martin Jonasson began to make a space station game that considered what he found enjoyable and least stressful about real-time strategy games. The game coalesced as he revised and removed features over the course of its year and a half of development. Rymdkapsel was written in Haxe, a programming language similar to ActionScript 3 that let Jonasson use the same code base for iOS, Android, and PC releases. He had used the language for years and had been making games for 20 years, primarily with Adobe Flash. Jonasson left his web development job in 2010 to "go indie", and Rymdkapsel was his "first full-time game". The game's name translates as "space capsule" in the Swedish language, which Jonasson liked as a title for its uniqueness and foreign overtones, though he acknowledged that the name was difficult for English speakers and made the game hard to find in the App Store.

He began the game after the 2012 Game Developers Conference as a weeklong diversion from another project, and slowly iterated into a full version. Jonasson started to prototype a game about a space station with a hull breach that releases the station's occupants into outer space. Within a day, he built a feature where players could build the station using tetromino blocks. He liked this direction better than the hull breach, and abandoned the latter idea by the end of prototyping. He built the room construction mechanics within a day, and to make the construction more challenging, later added three different resources to be spent towards room construction. When the resources did not "look as interesting" as he wanted, he added minions to defend the station. The minions—shown as small white boxes—have retained their original design. It is an example of the minimalist design theme that pervades the work. Jonasson has said that he kept the artificial intelligence "a bit stupid on purpose" (doing things such as stealing food intended for other minions) because he found their actions "a bit adorable". He otherwise removed the features he felt were not vital to the game. Jonasson then added "conflict" to the game by putting the minions in danger of being removed. If he ever got stuck visually, he would turn on 2001: A Space Odyssey until he got some inspiration.

Jonasson's game design was inspired by real-time strategy game Command & Conquer, where he enjoyed managing his home base but not attacking the enemy. He designed the game to last 45 minutes, which he felt to be a proper length, whereupon the difficulty ramps up to require station defense over base construction. He felt that it was reasonable to reach all four monoliths within that time to be ready for the endgame sequence, and that the limit made players expand outwards rather than keeping the station small and easy to defend. The sole map is hand-balanced, which made him reluctant to fulfill player requests to randomize it. He also considered adding a "zen" mode, which would pressure the player less. The music was composed by Niklas Ström.

The game was released on May 7, 2013, for PlayStation Vita and PlayStation Mobile. It was later included as a prize for completing "quests" in a Sony E3 2013 promotion. It is available on Android via the PlayStation Mobile app. The iOS and Android releases were released on July 25, 2013. Microsoft Windows, OS X, and Linux versions were released on January 30, 2014.

== Reception ==
Reception

Aggregate score
Aggregator	Score
Metacritic	iOS: 86/100; PC: 77/100; VITA: 75/100

Review scores
Publication	Score
Eurogamer	8/10
Game Informer	6.75/10
IGN	7.5/10
TouchArcade	5/5

The game received "generally favorable" reviews, according to video game review score aggregator Metacritic. Critics compared Rymdkapsel's gameplay to Tetris and SimCity. Of its visual style, The New York Times published that the game makes others in the real-time strategy genre "feel needlessly garnished". Reviewers generally appreciated the game's simplicity and challenge, but not its brevity and slow start. IGN's Steve Watts thought that the game made too many "design concessions" to its minimalism, though he considered the style "gorgeous", and felt that he was never fully in control of his base. Eurogamer's Tom Bramwell said that the game's minimalism extended to its core gameplay, where the player should strive to "play the game less and less". Joseph Leray of TouchArcade described the game's balance and pacing as "impeccable". He gave Rymdkapsel a perfect score and wrote that it felt as if it were custom-made for iOS. Bryan Vore of Game Informer criticized the game's lack of features and thought that it "fizzled out with no fanfare" as a "creative" idea but without sufficient "polish". The Verge's Trent Wolbe called the soundtrack "a minimalist achievement". Jonasson announced that the game had sold 200,000 copies as of December 2, 2013, due in large part to its inclusion in a Humble Bundle sale.

== See also ==
- Twofold Inc., game by the same developer
