= Starling Framework =

Open-source game framework

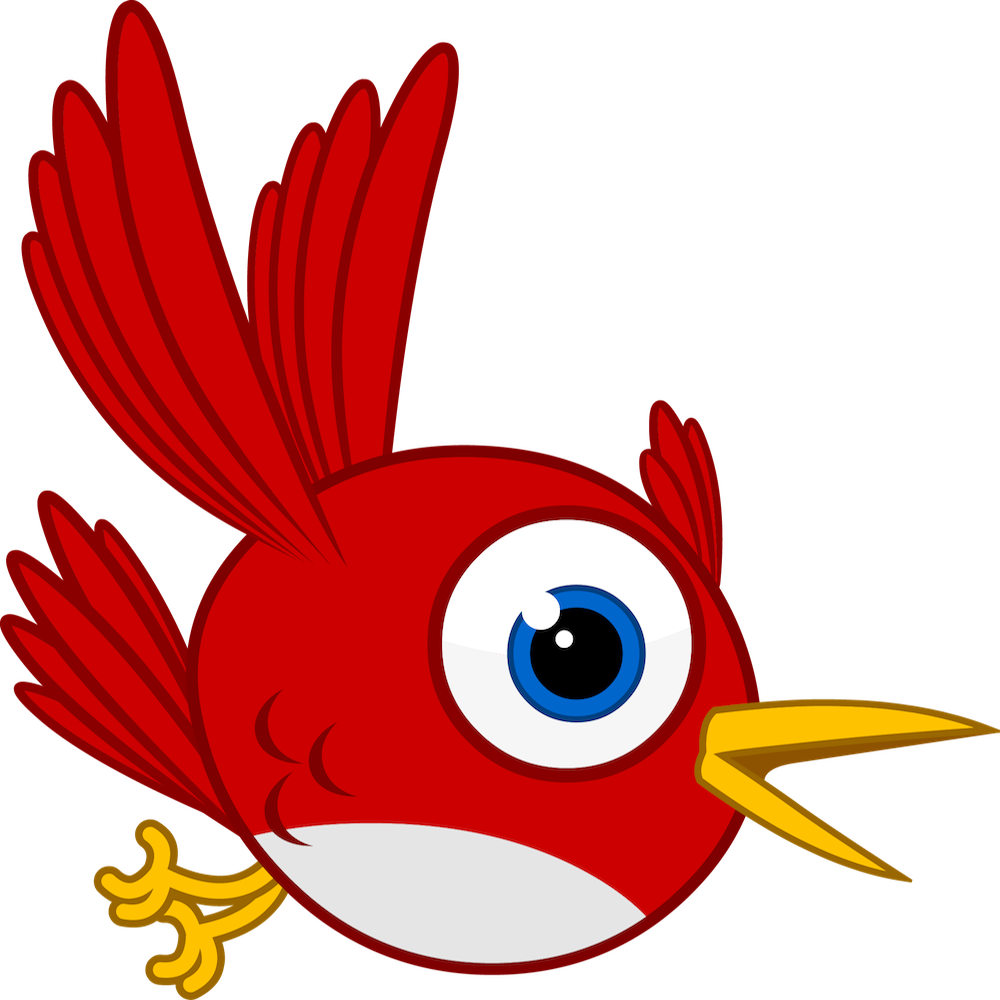
- Developer: Gamua
- Initial release: September 21, 2011
- Stable release: 2.7 / 27 July 2021; 4 years ago
- Repository: github.com/Gamua/Starling-Framework
- Written in: ActionScript 3
- Platform: Cross-platform
- License: Simplified BSD
- Website: www.starling-framework.org

Starling is an open source game framework used to create 2D games that run both on mobile and desktop platforms. It recreates the traditional Flash display list architecture on top of accelerated graphics hardware. Several commercial games have been built with Starling, including Angry Birds Friends and Incredipede.

== History ==
Starling was initiated in 2011 by Adobe shortly after introducing the Stage3D API in their AIR and Flash run-time systems. Stage3D allows utilizing the GPU inside the Flash Player via a low-level API; Starling should simplify the transition for developers by providing an accompanying high-level API built on top of Stage3D.

The framework has seen rapid adoption over the years, being utilized in many games from both independent and commercial developers. It is now a part of the Adobe Gaming SDK.

== Library ecosystem ==
Since Starling's introduction, several Open Source libraries were published by 3rd party developers that depend on Starling and extend its functionality.

- Feathers allows the creation of light-weight user interfaces for both mobile and desktop games and applications.
- Citrus Engine is a game engine that is most popular for its Platformer starter-kit.
- Dragon Bones is a 2D skeletal animation solution, available as a plugin for Flash, exporting animations for Starling.
- StarlingPunk is designed for developing 2D Flash games, inspired by the popular FlashPunk framework.
- Flox is a Backend as a Service targeting especially Starling developers (and built by the same team).
- GameBuilder Studio is an Open Source Game Engine and visual WYSIWYG tool for creating professional cross-platform 2D games. Optimized for mobile and web using the Starling rendering engine. [Ouya Target | Platformer plugin | Isometric | Multiplayer via Plugin.IO, etc.]

== See also ==
- Cairo
- OpenFL
