= Away3D =

Open-source game engine

- The Away Builder interface with a sample polar bear 3D model (center), and object hierarchy (left).
- Original authors: Rob Bateman, Alexander Zadorozhny, Fabrice Closier, Peter Kapelyan, Greg Caldwell, Andreas Engstrom, Stephen White, David Lenaerts, Richard Olsson, Cauê Waneck
- Developer: Away Foundation
- Initial release: 2007; 18 years ago
- Final release: 4.1.6 / 24 January 2014; 11 years ago
- Repository: github.com/away3d/away3d-core-fp11
- Written in: ActionScript 3, TypeScript
- Operating system: Web, Windows, iOS, Android, BlackBerry
- Type: Game engine
- License: Apache License 2.0
- Website: away3d.com

Away3D is an open-source platform for developing interactive 3D graphics for video games and applications, in Adobe Flash or HTML5. The platform consists of a 3D world editor (Away Builder), a 3D graphics engine (Away3D or AwayJS), a 3D physics engine (Away Physics) and a compressed 3D model file format (AWD).

Development is managed by the Away Foundation, a UK-based non-profit focused on building and maintaining free and open-source software resources for high-performance mobile games and applications. The foundation is supported by corporate sponsorship (Adobe, JetBrains among others) and individual donors.

== Platform ==
=== Away Builder ===
Away Builder is an open-source integrated development environment for importing, refining, preparing and exporting 3D models and animations. It can import 3D models from various 3D applications such as Autodesk 3ds Max, and can bake lighting into texture maps. The primary purpose of Away Builder is exporting 3D model packages for the Away3D engine. It supports the compressed AWD binary format, enabling smaller sizes for 3D models than ASCII-based formats such as OBJ.

The Away Extension's plugin enables exporting 2D and 3D content from Adobe Animate into Away3D or AwayJS.

=== Away3D ===
Away3D is an open-source ActionScript 3 engine for developing interactive 3D graphics within Adobe Flash Player and Adobe AIR. Away3D runs on current web browsers utilizing the Adobe Flash Player, and uses Stage3D for GPU-accelerated rendering.

The engine can render 3D models and perform various other 3D computations. It supports hierarchical object transformation with features such as position, rotation and scaling, rendering of bitmap textures. Real-time lighting and illumination is supported using Phong shading, Gouraud shading, point and directional lighting, cascading shadows, normal and specular mapping, global illumination and fog effects. It also supports stereoscopic rendering, 3D sound, extrusion tools, particle animation and skeletal animation. Post-processing effects may be used to enhance the quality of the graphics, and Away3D supports bloom, blur, depth of field and motion blur.

Away3D 4 and onwards fully supports GPU-accelerated graphics using the Stage3D API introduced in Flash Player 11, freeing up the CPU for other computational tasks. Since GPUs are capable of rendering many more textured triangles per second, it allows for much more detail and quality, and up to 100,000 triangles per frame instead of the typical 1,000 ceiling with CPU-based Flash rendering.

Away Physics is a physics engine based on the Bullet physics library, for collision detection, soft and rigid body dynamics. The engine is built jointly by the Away3D team and the JiglibFlash team, and is tightly integrated with the Away3D render pipeline.

=== AwayJS ===
AwayJS is an open-source JavaScript 3D graphics rendering engine for HTML5 web browsers, and is a port of the Adobe Flash-based Away3D. The Away3D codebase was ported to Microsoft TypeScript, a strongly-typed version of JavaScript that compiles to JavaScript files for compatibility with modern web standards. AwayJS runs on current web browsers and uses WebGL for GPU-accelerated rendering.

The engine can render 3D models and perform various other 3D computations. It supports hierarchical object transformation with features such as position, rotation and scaling, rendering of bitmap textures, and real-time lighting using Phong shading or Gouraud shading. It also supports shadow mapping, particle animation and skeletal animation.

AwayJS can render 2D and 3D graphical content using WebGL for GPU-accelerated rendering. It enables developers to use the existing Away Builder toolkit for editing, refining, compressing and texture baking 3D models and animations. AwayJS also supports the compressed AWD binary format, enabling smaller sizes for 3D models than ASCII-based formats such as OBJ.

The AwayJS API is consistent with the Flash version of Away3D, enabling existing developers to migrate from Flash to HTML5 seamlessly. To preserve backward-compatibility with Away3D, AwayJS enables developers to write GPU shaders in the Adobe Graphics Assembly Language (AGAL), or the standard OpenGL Shading Language (GLSL).

== History ==
Away3D was started in 2007 by Alexander Zadorozhny and Rob Bateman as a fork of Papervision3D.

Away3D saw active community involvement since its introduction in 2007, and superseded Papervision3D after it was updated to support GPU-accelerated rendering using Stage3D. Three guide books have been published on 3D content development with Away3D.

The author states that the engine began as a spare-time project, and was created for fun. After large ad agencies and game publishers started it, they had to "evolve to keep pace". In an interview he further states:

We never realized how big it would become, but our intention has always been to provide accessible tools and libraries that assist in the creation of 3D content, for anyone, all for free and open source. Seeing what amazing things people build with our libraries never gets boring, and there is still so much we want to improve and add.

— Robert Bateman, Founder, Interview with Robert Bateman, founder of Away3d, by JetBrains

In 2009, the Away3D community released Away3D Lite, a lighter version of the engine for Flash advertisements and other size-constrained content. Away3D Lite was the fastest and smallest full-featured 3D engine built for Flash. It weighed in at 25 KB and performed 4 times faster than the full Away3D engine. No future versions were released.

In 2011, a Flash book noted in the section on "3D with Flash" that "Away3D and Alternativa3D are currently the preferred solution for performance and features because they have a more active development community".

In 2013, Adobe chose Away3D as the sole 3D engine included within the Adobe Gaming SDK. Since then, Adobe has funded further development in Away3D and Away Builder, and has updated the Adobe Gaming SDK with new releases of Away3D.

In 2016, Away3D 1.2 was ported to the Haxe multiplatform language, enabling it to be cross-compiled to JavaScript and other languages that support 3D graphics. This also enables Away3D to run on OpenFL, a software framework with an API that is very similar to Adobe Flash Player API.
