= MTASC =

ActionScript 2 compiler

- Original author: Nicolas Cannasse
- Developer: Tristan Schmelcher
- Initial release: October 25, 2004; 21 years ago
- Final release: 1.15 / October 7, 2009; 16 years ago
- Repository: github.com/ncannasse/mtasc
- Written in: OCaml
- Successor: Haxe
- Type: Compiler
- License: GPL 2
- Website: tech.motion-twin.com/mtasc.html

MTASC (Motion-Twin ActionScript 2 Compiler) is an ActionScript 2.0 compiler written in the OCaml programming language by the company Motion Twin. It is free software and can be used alone or with other tools like swfmill to produce SWF files, which contain interactive multimedia content playable with the Flash Player. MTASC is also much faster than the Adobe Flash ActionScript compiler.

MTASC is built with optimizing OCaml compilers, and thus provides a speed improvement over the Macromedia Compiler (MMC). MTASC corrects several safety problems that occur when using MMC. The MTASC compiler is stricter than MMC and can detect more errors than MMC; because of this strictness, there are some differences between MMC and MTASC.

MTASC is not compatible with ActionScript 2.0 in the local variables scoping, local function definitions, etc.

MTASC will not support ActionScript 3.0, which is supported by its successor, Haxe.

== See also ==
- CrossBridge
- Flex
- Tamarin
