= Stage3D =

API for rendering interactive 3D graphics

Stage3D (codenamed Molehill) is an Adobe Flash Player API for rendering interactive 3D graphics with GPU-acceleration, within Flash games and applications. Flash Player or AIR applications written in ActionScript 3 may use Stage3D to render 3D graphics, and such applications run natively on Windows, Mac OS X, Linux, Apple iOS and Google Android. Stage3D is similar in purpose and design to WebGL.

Stage3D was introduced in Adobe Flash Player 11.0 and AIR 3.0 in order to facilitate GPU-acceleration of 3D content in Flash applications In Flash Player 10 and earlier, 3D Flash applications had to render 3D graphics completely on the CPU. Flash Player 10 supported a limited form of GPU acceleration support for materials, in an API called Pixel Bender.

GPU Shaders in Stage3D are expressed in the Adobe Graphics Assembly Language (AGAL). Stage3D objects depart from the traditional SWF rendering model in that they cannot be added to SWF's display lists; instead they must be instantiated via ActionScript.

Because Stage3D is a low-level library that may be tedious to use directly, it has seen some higher-level 3D and 2D libraries built on top of it in order to benefit from the higher performance that it provides. An incomplete list of libraries and game engines using it includes: Unreal Engine 3, Away3D 4, CopperCube, Flare3D, Starling, ND2D or Adobe Labs' Proscenium. Similarly, WebGL 3D applications may be built with three.js, a higher-level library similar to these. Away3D and Starling have been christened as official components of the Adobe Gaming SDK.

== History ==
In 2011, Flash Player 11 was released, and with it the first version of Stage3D, allowing for GPU-accelerated 3D rendering for Flash applications and games, on desktop platforms such as Microsoft Windows and Mac OS X.

In March 2012, Flash Player 11.2 was released, which enabled Stage3D/GPU support on Android and iOS platforms. Games utilizing Stage3D APIs would work with no changes on these mobile platforms.

In June 2012, Flash Player 11.3 was released, enabling progressive streaming of Stage3D texture maps, allowing for faster performance and startup times for games and applications utilizing Stage3D.

In August 2012, Flash Player 11.4 was released, which raised the supported hardware-accelerated video cards count to 2006, and allowed alpha-channels for Stage3D compressed textures.

In March 2012, Adobe announced that Stage3D will be part of the premium features of the Flash Player (stating with Flash Player version 11.2), and thus not available completely free of charge to developers, but based on a revenue sharing scheme. Various notable members of the Flash community objected to the change, referring to it as a "speed-tax".

In January 2013, Adobe classified all premium features as general availability, and could be freely used by Flash applications, without requiring a license or royalty from developers or publishers.

In September 2012, Flash Player 11.4 was released allowing games to target "constrained profiles" which included older graphics chips, that did not support all the features of Stage3D.

In April 2013, Flash Player 11.7 was released, which supported 16-bit texture maps for Stage3D content, which allowed reduced memory usage and improved memory management.

In July 2013, Flash Player 11.8 was released, which increased the maximum texture map size to 4096 x 4096, in addition to supporting rectangular (non-square) texture maps for Stage3D content. This allowed for greater detail in texture maps, and larger texture atlases to be created enabling better performance.

As of 2014, GPU acceleration was removed in Flash Player 11.8 onwards for Pixel Bender scripts. Pixel Bender was an older technology for writing high-performance CPU-based image processing filters. This disrupted a number of less well-endowed projects, including MIT's Scratch, which could not find the manpower to rapidly recode their applications.

== Features ==
Stage3D consists of the following components:

- Unified API - Unified ActionScript 3 API for managing texture memory, vertex shading, pixel shading, and mesh rendering. Transparently executed using OpenGL (on Mac OS X and Linux) and DirectX (on Microsoft Windows).
- Accelerated GPU Rendering - Integrated support for graphic cards built by NVidia, AMD and Intel, Blacklist for incompatible graphic cards.
- Accelerated CPU Rendering - Integrated software renderer fallback using SwiftShader, for systems with missing/incompatible graphics cards.
- AGAL (Adobe Graphics Assembly Language) - A language for writing Shaders (programs that run on the GPU) such that they can be converted to OpenGL GLSL Shaders and DirectX HLSL Shaders by Flash Player.
- ATF (Adobe Texture Format) - A texture format such that textures can be converted to appropriate platform-specific texture formats such as DXT on Windows and MacOS, PVRTC on iOS.

Stage3D is supported by the following components:

- XC APIs - the "premium features" for Flash Player, consisting of high-speed memory manipulation opcodes (known as "Alchemy") and Stage3D APIs.
- CrossBridge - A cross-compilation toolkit to compile OpenGL-based 3D games or game engines to run within Flash Player.
- Adobe Scout - A visual profiler for Flash content running on desktop or mobile. Scout enables in-depth profiling of Stage3D content with the following integrated features:
  - Stage3D Preview - View the current back-buffer of executed Stage3D Content
  - Stage3D Recording - Capture every Stage3D command executed by the Flash content, and replay/step through executed commands
  - GPU memory usage - Profile texture memory usage with a real-time breakdown
  - Stage3D Program Editor - Interactively modify recorded Stage3D commands and see what effect this has on rendering. Edit the AGAL code for the vertex and fragment programs executed by each draw call.

== AGAL ==
Adobe Graphics Assembly Language (AGAL) is an assembly language for writing GPU shaders. AGAL was invented by Adobe to provide a unified shader language for all platforms. AGAL programs are written by hand with low-level opcodes and registers. AGAL programs are compiled into bytecode which is then embedded into Flash SWF movies. This AGAL bytecode is automatically compiled into OpenGL GLSL Shaders and DirectX HLSL Shaders by Adobe Flash Player, depending on the platform.

With AGAL, developers can write shaders that transform 3D models on the GPU (vertex shader), and shaders that render complex dynamic lighting effects on the GPU (pixel shader). AGAL also allows high-quality texture rendering with mip-mapping. AGAL is used extensively in Flash game engines such as Away3D and Flare3D for various effects. AGAL is commonly used to provide dynamic lighting, high dynamic ranging (HDR), alpha masking, multipass rendering, displacement mapping, and environment mapping. Flare3D extends AGAL with a proprietary Shader language called FLSL (FLare3D Shader Language), that makes writing Shader programs easier. HLAG is another example of a high-level Shader language that compiles into AGAL.

When porting C++ 3D video games for playback in Adobe Flash Player, developers must translate traditional HLSL and GLSL shaders into AGAL. The C++ video game code can be converted into Flash-compatible code using CrossBridge.

== See also ==
- Papervision3D
- WebGL
