= Adobe Flash Player =

Former multimedia software

- Original authors: FutureWave; Macromedia
- Developers: Adobe; Zhongcheng; Harman; Wipro
- Release: January 1, 1996; 30 years ago

Stable release(s) [±]
- Windows, macOS (China-specific variant): 34.0.0.380 / June 9, 2026; 5 months ago
- Windows, macOS, Linux (Harman/Wipro enterprise variant): 50.x / N/A
- Windows, macOS (Adobe Animate component variant): 35.0.0.204 / July 4, 2022; 4 years ago
- Linux (China-specific variant): 34.0.0.137 / April 13, 2021; 5 years ago
- Windows, macOS, Linux, ChromeOS (Global variant, excluding China): 32.0.0.465 / December 8, 2020; 5 years ago
- Internet Explorer 11 and Edge Legacy (Embedded - Windows 8 or later): 32.0.0.445 / October 13, 2020; 6 years ago
- Android 4.0.x: 11.1.115.81 / September 10, 2013; 13 years ago
- Android 2.x and 3.x: 11.1.111.73 / September 10, 2013; 13 years ago
- Solaris: 11.2.202.223 / March 28, 2012; 14 years ago

Preview release(s) [±]
- Windows, macOS, Linux, ChromeOS: 32.0.0.380 Beta / May 14, 2020; 6 years ago
- Written in: ActionScript
- Operating system: Windows, macOS, Linux, ChromeOS, Solaris, BlackBerry Tablet OS, Android, Pocket PC
- Platform: Web browsers and ActiveX-based software
- Available in: Afrikaans, Arabic, Chinese Simplified, Chinese Traditional, English, French, German, Italian, Japanese, Korean, Polish, Portuguese, Russian, Spanish, Telugu, Turkish, Vietnamese, Xhosa, Yiddish, and Zulu
- Type: Runtime system and browser extension
- License: Freeware
- Website: Adobe Flash (archived); Wipro Flash Player Support (Enterprise version); Flash China (China-only version)

Adobe Flash Player (known in Internet Explorer, Firefox, and Google Chrome as Shockwave Flash) is a discontinued (Note: Except in China, where it continues to be used, as well as Harman for enterprise users; and as part of Adobe Animate.) computer program for viewing multimedia content, executing rich Internet applications, and streaming audio and video content created on the Adobe Flash platform. It can run from a web browser as a browser plug-in or independently on supported devices. Originally created by FutureWave under the name FutureSplash Player, it was renamed to Macromedia Flash Player after Macromedia acquired FutureWave in 1996. After Adobe acquired Macromedia in 2005, it was developed and distributed by Adobe as Adobe Flash Player. It is currently developed and distributed by Zhongcheng for users in China, and by Wipro for enterprise users outside of China, in collaboration with Adobe.

Flash Player runs SWF files that can be created using Adobe Flash Professional, Adobe Flash Builder, or third-party tools such as FlashDevelop. Flash Player supports video and raster graphics; vector graphics; 3D graphics; embedded audio; and an object-oriented scripting language called ActionScript, which is based on ECMAScript (similar to JavaScript). Internet Explorer 11 and Microsoft Edge Legacy since Windows 8, along with Google Chrome on all versions of Windows, came bundled with a sandboxed Adobe Flash Player plug-in.

Flash Player once had a large user base, and was required to run many web games, animations, and graphical user interface (GUI) elements embedded in web pages. Adobe stated in 2013 that more than 400 million out of over 1 billion connected desktops updated to new versions of Flash Player within six weeks of release. However, Flash Player became increasingly criticized for poor performance, consumption of battery on mobile devices, the number of security vulnerabilities that had been discovered in the software, and its nature as a closed platform controlled by Adobe. Apple co-founder Steve Jobs was highly critical of Flash Player, having published an open letter criticising the platform and detailing Apple's reasoning for not supporting Flash on its iOS device family. Its usage further waned due to more modern web standards which replaced some of Flash's functionality, reducing the need for third-party plugins. This led to the eventual deprecation of the platform.

Flash Player was officially discontinued on December 31, 2020, and its download page was removed two days later. Since January 12, 2021, Flash Player (original global variants) versions newer than 32.0.0.371, released in May 2020, refuse to play Flash content and instead display a static warning message. The software remains supported in mainland China and in some enterprise variants, and as part of Adobe Animate.

== Features ==
Adobe Flash Player is a runtime that executes and displays content from a provided SWF file, although it has no in-built features to modify the SWF file at runtime. It can execute software written in the ActionScript programming language, which enables the runtime manipulation of text, data, vector graphics, raster graphics, sound, and video. The player can also access certain connected hardware devices, including the web cameras and microphones, after permission for the same has been granted by the user.

Flash Player was used internally by the Adobe Integrated Runtime (AIR), to provide a cross-platform runtime environment for desktop applications and mobile applications. AIR supports installable applications on Windows, Linux, macOS, and some mobile operating systems such as iOS and Android. Flash applications must specifically be built for the AIR runtime to use additional features provided, such as file system integration, native client extensions, native window/screen integration, taskbar/dock integration, and hardware integration with connected Accelerometer and GPS devices.

=== Data formats ===
Flash Player included native support for many data formats, some of which can only be accessed through the ActionScript scripting interface.

- XML: Flash Player has included native support for XML parsing and generation since version 6. XML data is held in memory as an XML Document Object Model, and can be manipulated using ActionScript. ActionScript 3 also supports ECMAScript for XML (E4X), which allows XML data to be manipulated more easily.
- JSON: Flash Player 11 includes native support for importing and exporting data in the JavaScript Object Notation (JSON) format, which allows interoperability with web services and JavaScript programs.
- AMF: Flash Player allows application data to be stored on users computers, in the form of Local Shared Objects, the Flash equivalent to browser cookies. Flash Player can also natively read and write files in the Action Message Format, the default data format for Local Shared Objects. Since the AMF format specification is published, data can be transferred to and from Flash applications using AMF datasets instead of JSON or XML, reducing the need for parsing and validating such data.
- SWF: The specification for the SWF file format was published by Adobe, enabling the development of the SWX Format project, which used the SWF file format and AMF as a means for Flash applications to exchange data with server-side applications. The SWX system stores data as standard SWF bytecode which is automatically interpreted by Flash Player. Another open-source project, SWXml allows Flash applications to load XML files as native ActionScript objects without any client-side XML parsing, by converting XML files to SWF/AMF on the server.

=== Multimedia formats ===
Flash Player is primarily a graphics and multimedia platform, and has supported raster graphics and vector graphics since its earliest version. It supports the following different multimedia formats, which it can natively decode and play back.

- MP3: Support for decoding and playback of streaming MPEG-2 Audio Layer III (MP3) audio was introduced in Flash Player 4. MP3 files can be accessed and played back from a server via HTTP, or embedded inside an SWF file, which is also a streaming format.
- FLV: Support for decoding and playing back video and audio inside Flash Video (FLV and F4V) files, a format developed by Adobe Systems and Macromedia. Flash Video is only a container format and supports multiple different video codecs, such as Sorenson Spark, VP6, and more recently H.264. Flash Player uses hardware acceleration to display video where present, using technologies such as DirectX Video Acceleration and OpenGL to do so. Flash Video is used by YouTube, Hulu, Yahoo! Video, BBC Online, and other news providers. FLV files can be played back from a server using HTTP progressive download, and can also be embedded inside an SWF file. Flash Video can also be streamed via RTMP using the Adobe Flash Media Server or other such server-side software.
- PNG: Support for decoding and rendering Portable Network Graphics (PNG) images, in both its 24-bit (opaque) and 32-bit (semi-transparent) variants. Flash Player 11 can also encode a PNG bitmap via ActionScript.
- JPEG: Support for decoding and rendering compressed JPEG images. Flash Player 10 added support for the JPEG-XR advanced image compression standard developed by Microsoft Corporation, which results in better compression and quality than JPEG. JPEG-XR enables lossy and lossless compression with or without alpha channel transparency. Flash Player 11 can also encode a JPEG or JPEG-XR bitmap via ActionScript.
- GIF: Support for decoding and rendering compressed Graphics Interchange Format (GIF) images, in its single-frame variants only. Loading a multi-frame GIF will display only the first image frame.

=== Streaming protocols ===
- HTTP: Support for communicating with web servers using HTTP requests and POST data. However, only websites that explicitly allow Flash to connect to them can be accessed via HTTP or sockets, to prevent Flash being used as a tool for cross-site request forgery, cross-site scripting, DNS rebinding, and denial-of-service attacks. Websites must host a certain XML file termed a cross domain policy, allowing or denying Flash content from specific websites to connect to them. Certain websites, such as Digg, Flickr, and Photobucket already host a cross-domain policy that permits Flash content to access their website via HTTP.
- RTMP: Support for live audio and video streaming using the Real-Time Messaging Protocol (RTMP) developed by Macromedia. RTMP supports a non-encrypted version over the Transmission Control Protocol (TCP) or an encrypted version over a secure Transport Layer Security (SSL) connection. RTMPT can also be encapsulated within HTTP requests to traverse firewalls that only allow HTTP traffic.
- TCP: Support for Transmission Control Protocol (TCP) Internet socket communication to communicate with any type of server, using stream sockets. Sockets can be used only via ActionScript, and can transfer plain text, XML, or binary data (ActionScript 3.0 or later). To prevent security issues, web servers that permit Flash content to communicate with them using sockets must host an XML-based cross domain policy file, served on Port 843. Sockets enable AS3 programs to interface with any kind of server software, such as MySQL.

=== Performance ===
==== Hardware acceleration ====
Until version 10 of the Flash player, there was no support for GPU acceleration. Version 10 added a limited form of support for shaders on materials in the form of the Pixel Bender API, but still did not have GPU-accelerated 3D vertex processing. A significant change came in version 11, which added a new low-level API called Stage3D (initially codenamed Molehill), which provides full GPU acceleration, similar to WebGL. (The partial support for GPU acceleration in Pixel Bender was completely removed in Flash 11.8, resulting in the disruption of some projects like MIT's Scratch, which lacked the manpower to recode their applications quickly enough.)

Current versions of Flash Player are optimized to use hardware acceleration for video playback and 3D graphics rendering on many devices, including desktop computers. Performance is similar to HTML video playback. Also, Flash Player has been used on multiple mobile devices as a primary user interface renderer.

==== Compilation ====
Although code written in ActionScript 3 executes up to 10 times faster than the prior ActionScript 2, the Adobe ActionScript 3 compiler is a non-optimizing compiler, and produces inefficient bytecode in the resulting SWF, when compared to toolkits such as CrossBridge.

CrossBridge, a toolkit that targets C++ code to run within the Flash Player, uses the LLVM compiler to produce bytecode that runs up to 10 times faster than code the ActionScript 3 compiler produces, only because the LLVM compiler uses more aggressive optimization.

Adobe has released ActionScript Compiler 2 (ASC2) in Flex 4.7 and onwards, which improves compilation times and optimizes the generated bytecode and supports method inlining, improving its performance at runtime.

As of 2012, the Haxe multiplatform language can build programs for Flash Player that perform faster than the same application built with the Adobe Flex SDK compiler.

== Development methods ==
Flash Player applications and games can be built in two significantly different ways:

- "Flex" applications: The Adobe Flex Framework is an integrated collection of stylable graphical user interface, data manipulation, and networking components, and applications built upon it are termed "Flex" applications. Startup time is reduced since the Flex framework must be downloaded before the application begins, and it weighs in at approximately 500 KB. Editors include Adobe Flash Builder and FlashDevelop.
- "Pure ActionScript" applications: Applications built without the Flex framework allow greater flexibility and performance. Video games built for Flash Player are typically pure-Actionscript projects. Various open-source component frameworks are available for pure ActionScript projects, such as MadComponents, that provide UI Components at significantly smaller SWF file sizes.

In both methods, developers can access the full Flash Player set of functions, including text, vector graphics, bitmap graphics, video, audio, camera, microphone, and others. AIR also includes added features such as file system integration, native extensions, native desktop integration, and hardware integration with connected devices.

== Development tools ==
Adobe provides five ways of developing applications for Flash Player:

- Adobe Animate: graphic design, animation, and scripting toolset
- Adobe Flash Builder: enterprise application development and debugging
- Adobe Scout: visual profiler for performance optimization
- Apache Flex: a free SDK to compile Flash and Adobe AIR applications from source code; developed by Adobe and donated to the Apache Foundation
- CrossBridge: a free SDK to cross-compile C++ code to run in Flash Player

Third-party development environments are also available:

- FlashDevelop: an open-source Flash ActionScript IDE, which includes a debugger for AIR applications
- Powerflasher FDT: a commercial ActionScript IDE
- CodeDrive: an extension to Microsoft Visual Studio 2010 for ActionScript 3 development and debugging
- MTASC: a compiler
- Haxe: a multi-platform language

=== Game development ===
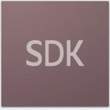
Adobe Gaming SDK 1.0 logo

Adobe offers the free Adobe Gaming SDK, consisting (as of August 2014) of several open-source AS3 libraries built on the Flash Player Stage3D APIs for GPU-accelerated graphics:

- Away3D: GPU-accelerated 3D graphics and animation engine
- Starling: GPU-accelerated 2D graphics that mimics the Flash display list API
- Feathers: GPU-accelerated skinnable GUI library built on top of Starling
- Dragon Bones: GPU-accelerated 2D skeletal animation library

A few commercial game engines target Flash Player (Stage3D) as run-time environment, such as Unity 3D and Unreal Engine 3. Before the introduction of Stage3D, a number of older 2D engines or isometric engines like Flixel saw their heyday.

Adobe also developed the CrossBridge toolkit which cross-compiles C/C++ code to run within the Flash Player, using LLVM and GCC as compiler backends, and high-performance memory-access opcodes in the Flash Player (termed "Domain Memory") to work with in-memory data quickly. CrossBridge is targeted toward the game development industry, and includes tools for building, testing, and debugging C/C++ projects in Flash Player.

Notable online video games developed in Flash include Angry Birds, FarmVille, and AdventureQuest (started in 2002, and still active as of 2020).

== Availability ==
=== Desktop platforms ===
Adobe Flash Player is available in two major versions:

1. The plugin version for use in various web browsers
2. The "projector" version is a standalone player that can open SWF files directly.

On February 22, 2012, Adobe announced that it would no longer release new versions of NPAPI Flash plugins for Linux, although Flash Player 11.2 would continue to receive security updates. In August 2016, Adobe announced that, beginning with version 24, it would resume offering of Flash Player for Linux for other browsers.

The Extended Support Release (ESR) of Flash Player on macOS and Windows was a version of Flash Player kept up to date with security updates, but it did not include the new features or bug fixes available in later versions. In August 2016, Adobe discontinued the ESR branch and instead focused solely on the standard release.

Release history for desktop operating systems
| Operating system | | First version | Latest version | Support status |
|---|---|---|---|---|
| Windows | XP, Vista, 7, 8, 8.1, 10 and 11 21H2–24H2 | 1 | 34.0.0.372 (China-specific); 50.x (Harman/Wipro enterprise); 32.0.0.465 (last public update, excluding China); 35.0.0.204 (Adobe Animate component) | 2017–present 2021–present 2001–2020 ?–present |
| Windows | 2000 | 1 | 11.1.102.55 and 10.3.183.90 | 1999–2013 |
| Windows | 98 and ME | 1 | 9.0.289.0 | 1998–2011 |
| Windows | 95 and NT 4.0 (IA-32) | 1 | 7.0.14.0 | 1996–2005 |
| Windows | 3.1 | 1 | 3 | 1996–1998 |
| macOS | 10.12 – 15.x | 5.0.41.0 | 34.0.0.372 (China-specific) | 2017–present |
| macOS | 10.10 – 15.x | 5.0.41.0 | 50.x (Harman/Wipro enterprise); 32.0.0.465 (last public update, excluding China); 35.0.0.204 (Adobe Animate component) | 2021–present 2014–2020 ?-present |
| macOS | 10.9 | 5.0.41.0 | 29.0.0.171 | 2013–2018 |
| macOS | 10.6 – 10.8 (IA-32, x64) | 5.0.41.0 | 22.0.0.209 | 2009–2016 |
| macOS | 10.5 (IA-32, x64) | 5.0.41.0 | 10.3.183.90 | 2007–2013 |
| macOS | 10.4 (IA-32, PPC) – 10.5 (PPC) | 5.0.41.0 | 10.1.102.64 | 2005–2011 |
| macOS | 10.1 – 10.3 | 5.0.41.0 | 9.0.289.0 | 2001–2011 |
| Classic Mac OS | 7.6.1 – 9.2.2 (PowerPC) | 1 | 7.0.14.0 | 1996–2005 |
| Classic Mac OS | 7.6.1 – 8.1 (68k) | 1 | 3 | 1996–1998 |
| Linux desktops | | 4.0r12 | 50.x (Harman/Wipro enterprise); 34.0.0.137 (last public update, China-specific); 32.0.0.465 (last public update, excluding China) | 2021–present 2017–2021; 1999–2020 |
| Solaris and OpenSolaris | | 4.0r12 | 11.2.202.223 and 10.3.183.90 | 2004–2013 |
| IRIX | | 4.0r12 | 4.0.r12 | 1999 |

Version 10 can be run under Windows 98/Me using KernelEx. HP offered Version 6 of the player for HP-UX, while Innotek GmbH offered versions 4 and 5 for OS/2. Other versions of the player have been available at some point for BeOS.

=== Mobile platforms ===
In 2011, Flash Player had emerged as the de facto standard for online video publishing on the desktop, with adaptive bitrate video streaming, DRM, and full-screen support. On mobile devices, however, after Apple refused to allow the Flash Player within iOS's integrated web browser, Adobe changed its strategy, enabling Flash content to be delivered as native mobile applications using the Adobe Integrated Runtime.

Up until 2012, Flash Player 11 was available for the Android (ARM Cortex-A8 and above), although in June 2012, Google announced that Android 4.1 (codenamed Jelly Bean) would not support Flash by default. In August 2012, Adobe stopped updating Flash for Android.

Flash Player was supported on a select range of mobile and tablet devices, from Acer, BlackBerry 10, Dell, HTC, Lenovo, Logitech, LG, Motorola, Samsung, Sharp, SoftBank, Sony (and Sony Ericsson), and Toshiba. As of 2012, Adobe has stopped browser-based Flash Player development for mobile browsers in favor of HTML5; however, Adobe continues to support Flash content on mobile devices with the Adobe Integrated Runtime, which allows developers to publish content that runs as native applications on certain supported mobile phone platforms.

Adobe said it will optimize Flash for use on ARM architecture (ARMv7 and ARMv6 architectures used in the Cortex-A series of processors and in the ARM11 family) and release it in the second half of 2009. The company also stated it wants to enable Flash on NVIDIA Tegra, Texas Instruments OMAP 3, and Samsung ARMs. Beginning 2009, it was announced that Adobe would be bringing Flash to TV sets via Intel Media Processor CE 3100 before mid-2009. ARM Holdings later said it welcomes the move of Flash, because "it will transform mobile applications and it removes the claim that the desktop controls the Internet." However, as of May 2009, the expected ARM/Linux netbook devices had poor support for Web video and a fragmented software base.

Among other devices, LeapFrog Enterprises provides Flash Player with their Leapster Multimedia Learning System and extended the Flash Player with touch-screen support. Version 9 was the most recent version available for the Linux/ARM-based Nokia 770/N800/N810 Internet tablets running Maemo OS2008. Other versions of the player have been available at some point for Symbian OS and Palm OS. The Kodak Easyshare One includes Flash Player.

The following table documents historical support for Flash Player on mobile operating systems:

| Platform | Final version |
|---|---|
| Android 4.0, ARM Cortex-A8+ | Flash Player 11.1.115.81 |
| Android 2.2–3.x, ARM Cortex-A8+ | Flash Player 11.1.111.73 |
| Dreamcast | Flash Player 4.0 |
| Maemo | Flash Player 9.4 |
| PlayStation 3 with Firmware 2.50, NetFront 2.81 | Flash Player 9.1 (update 3) |
| PSP with Firmware 2.70 | Flash Player 6 |
| Pocket PC 2003 | Flash Player 7 |
| webOS (Palm and HP) | Flash Player 10 |
| Windows Mobile 5 | Flash Player 7 |

=== Other hardware ===
Some CPU emulators have been created for Flash Player, including Chip8, Commodore 64, ZX Spectrum, and the Nintendo Entertainment System. They enable video games created for such platforms to run within Flash Player.

=== End of life ===
Adobe announced on July 25, 2017, that it would end support for the normal/global variant of Flash Player on January 1, 2021, and encouraged developers to use HTML5 standards in place of Flash. The announcement was coordinated with Apple, Facebook, Google, Microsoft, and Mozilla. Adobe announced that all major web browsers planned to officially remove the Adobe Flash Player component on December 31, 2020, and Microsoft removed it from the Windows OS in January 2021 via Windows Update. In a move to further reduce the number of Flash Player installations, Adobe added a "time bomb" to Flash to disable existing installations after January 12, 2021. In mid-2020, Flash Player started prompting users to uninstall itself. Adobe removed all existing download links for Flash installers. After January 26, 2021, all major web browsers including Apple Safari, Google Chrome, Microsoft Edge, and Mozilla Firefox have already permanently removed Flash support. However, Flash content continues to be accessible on the web through emulators such as Ruffle, with varying degrees of compatibility and performance, although this is not endorsed by Adobe.

==== Web browsers ====
===== Google Chrome =====
Starting from Chrome 76, Flash is disabled by default without any prompts to activate Flash content. Users who wanted to play Flash content had to manually set a browser to prompt for Flash content, and then during each browser session, enable Flash plugin for every site individually. Microsoft Edge, which is based on Chromium, followed the same plan as Google Chrome.

Google Chrome blocked the Flash plugin as "out of date" in January 2021, and fully removed it from the browser with Chrome version 88, released on January 20, 2021.

===== Mozilla Firefox =====
Starting with Firefox 85, Flash is disabled by default without any prompts to activate Flash content. To play Flash content, users had to manually set a browser to prompt for Flash content, and then, during each browser session, enable the Flash plugin for every site individually. Firefox 85, released on January 26, 2021, completely removed support for the Flash plugin. Firefox ESR dropped support on November 2, 2021 (Firefox 78 ESR was the last version with support).

===== Microsoft Windows =====
On October 27, 2020, Microsoft released an update (named KB4577586) for Windows 10 and 8.1 which removes the embedded Adobe Flash Player component from IE11 and Edge Legacy. In July 2021, this update was automatically installed as a security patch. However, an ActiveX Flash Player plugin may still be used with IE after this update is applied.

===== Apple Safari =====
Apple dropped Flash Player support from Safari 14 alongside the release of macOS Big Sur.

==== Fallout ====
Despite the years of notice, several websites still were using Flash following December 31, 2020, including the U.S. Securities and Exchange Commission. Many of these were resolved in the weeks after the deadline. However, many educational institutions still relied on Flash for educational material and did not have a path forward for replacement.

==== Post-EOL support ====
===== Mainland China =====
The China-specific variant of Flash is still supported, by a company known as Zhongcheng. The Projector (standalone) versions of this variant also work outside of China and do not include the "Flash Helper Service"; however, some tracking code still seems to be present. They are available on a somewhat hidden "Debug" page. In addition, as the global variant of the plugin was discontinued, some users have figured out how to modify and repack the China-specific variant to bring it more in line with the global variant. This includes removing the "Flash Helper Service" and removing the China-only installation restriction, along with all other geo-restrictions and tracking code. A "time bomb", similar to the one found in later versions of the global variant, is also present in the unmodified China variant; this is also removed in most repacks. In theory, these repacks should provide users outside of China with the latest security updates to Flash Player, without having to deal with invasive advertisements or worry about privacy risks. One such project, "Clean Flash Installer", was served a DMCA takedown from Adobe in October 2021.

===== Enterprise =====
Adobe has partnered with Harman to support enterprise Flash Player users until at least 2023. The Harman Flash player variant is labeled as version 50.x, to avoid confusion with other variants. As of December 2025, it is now supported by Wipro.

===== Web browsers =====
Internet Explorer 11, along with IE mode in Edge, will continue with ActiveX support, and by extension Flash Player support. Firefox forks that plan to continue NPAPI support, and by extension Flash Player support, include Basilisk, Pale Moon, K-Meleon, and Waterfox Classic. Various Chromium-based Chinese browsers will also continue to support Flash Player in PPAPI and/or NPAPI form, including, but not limited to, 360 Secure Browser.

Shortly after Flash reached end-of-life, South African Revenue Service (SARS) released a custom version of the Chromium browser with the Adobe Flash Player "time bomb" removed. This browser can access only a small set of SARS online pages containing Flash-based forms required for filing financial reports.

===== Adobe Flash Player Projector =====
Although no longer available directly from Adobe, all versions of Adobe Flash Player Projector (also known as Adobe Flash Player Standalone) lack the "time bomb" present in the newer plug-in variants, and thus continue to be able to play all supported Flash file formats, including SWF files, without modification.

Adobe Animate

Installations of Adobe Animate include a version of Adobe Flash Player, which may be found in the folders where the Adobe Animate program is stored.

===== Content preservation projects =====
The Internet Archive hosts some Flash content and makes it playable in modern browsers via the Ruffle emulator integrated within its Emularity system. Other emulators, such as CheerpX, also exist as options for Flash Player emulation on other websites. The Flashpoint Archive project claims to have collected more than 38,000 Adobe Flash Player games and animations and made them available for download.

== Open source ==
Adobe has released some components of Adobe Flash products as open source software via the Open Screen Project or donated them to open source organizations. As of 2021, most of these technologies are considered obsolete. This includes: ActionScript Virtual Machine 2 (AVM2) which implements ActionScript 3 (donated as open-source to Mozilla Foundation), Adobe Flex Framework (donated as open-source to the Apache Software Foundation and rebranded as Apache Flex, superseded by Apache Royale), CrossBridge C++ cross-compilation toolset (released on GitHub).

== Criticism ==
=== Accessibility and usability ===
In some browsers, prior Flash versions have had to be uninstalled before an updated version could be installed. However, as of version 11.2 for Windows, there are now automatic updater options. Linux is partially supported, as Adobe is cooperating with Google to implement it via Chrome web browser on all Linux platforms.

Mixing Flash applications with HTML leads to inconsistent input handling, leading to poor user experience with the site (keyboard and mouse not working as they would in an HTML-only document).

=== Privacy ===
Flash Player supports persistent local storage of data (also referred to as Local Shared Objects), which can be used similarly to HTTP cookies or Web Storage in web applications. Local storage in Flash Player allows websites to store non-executable data on a user's computer, such as authentication information, game high scores or web browser games, server-based session identifiers, site preferences, saved work, or temporary files. Flash Player will only allow content originating from the same website domain to access data saved in local storage.

Because local storage can be used to save information on a computer that is later retrieved by the same site, a site can use it to gather user statistics, similar to how HTTP cookies and Web Storage can be used. With such technologies, the possibility of building a profile based on user statistics is considered by some a potential privacy concern. Users can disable or restrict the use of local storage in Flash Player through a "Settings Manager" page. These settings can be accessed from the Adobe website or by right-clicking on Flash-based content and selecting "Global Settings".

Local storage can be disabled entirely or on a site-by-site basis. Disabling local storage will block any content from saving local user information using Flash Player, but this may disable or reduce the functionality of some websites, such as saved preferences or high scores, and saved progress in games.

Flash Player 10.1 and upward honor the privacy mode settings in the latest versions of the Chrome, Firefox, Internet Explorer, and Safari web browsers, such that no local storage data is saved when the browser's privacy mode is in use.

=== Security ===
Adobe security bulletins and advisories announce security updates, but Adobe Flash Player release notes do not disclose the security issues addressed when a release closes security holes, making it difficult to evaluate the urgency of a particular update. A version test page allows the user to check if the latest version is installed, and uninstallers may be used to ensure that old-version plugins have been uninstalled from all installed browsers.

In February 2010, Adobe officially apologized for not fixing a known vulnerability for over a year. In June 2010 Adobe announced a "critical vulnerability" in recent versions, saying there are reports that this vulnerability is being actively exploited in the wild against both Adobe Flash Player, and Adobe Reader and Acrobat. Later, in October 2010, Adobe announced another critical vulnerability, this time also affecting Android-based mobile devices. Android users have been recommended to disable Flash or make it only on demand. Subsequent security vulnerabilities also exposed Android users, such as the two critical vulnerabilities published in February 2013 or the four critical vulnerabilities published in March 2013, all of which could lead to arbitrary code execution.

Symantec's Internet Security Threat Report states that a remote code execution in Adobe Reader and Flash Player was the second most attacked vulnerability in 2009. The same report also recommended using browser extensions to disable Flash Player usage on untrusted websites. McAfee predicted that Adobe software, especially Reader and Flash, would be the primary target for attacks in 2010. Adobe applications had become, at least at some point, the most popular client-software targets for attackers during the last quarter of 2009. The Kaspersky Security Network published statistics for the third quarter of 2012 showing that 47.5% of its users were affected by one or more critical vulnerabilities. The report also highlighted that "Flash Player vulnerabilities enable cybercriminals to bypass security systems integrated into the application."

Steve Jobs criticized the security of Flash Player, noting that "Symantec recently highlighted Flash for having one of the worst security records in 2009." Adobe responded by pointing out that "the Symantec Global Internet Threat Report for 2009, found that Flash Player had the second lowest number of vulnerabilities of all Internet technologies listed (which included both web plug-ins and browsers)."

On April 7, 2016, Adobe released a Flash Player patch for a zero-day memory corruption vulnerability CVE-2016-1019 that could be used to deliver malware via the Magnitude exploit kit. The vulnerability could be exploited for remote code execution.

=== Vendor lock-in ===
Flash Player 11.2 does not play certain kinds of content unless it has been digitally signed by Adobe, following a license obtained by the publisher directly from Adobe.

This move by Adobe, together with the abandonment of Flex to Apache, was criticized as a way to lock out independent tool developers in favor of Adobe's commercial tools.

This has been resolved as of January 2013, after Adobe no longer required a license or royalty from the developer. All premium features are now classified as general availability and can be freely used by Flash applications.

=== Apple controversy ===
In April 2010, Steve Jobs, at the time CEO of Apple Inc. published an open letter explaining why Apple would not support Flash on the iPhone, iPod Touch, and iPad. In the letter, he blamed problems with the "openness", stability, security, performance, and touchscreen integration of the Flash Player as reasons for refusing to support it. He also claimed that when one of Apple's Macintosh computers crashes, "more often than not" the cause can be attributed to Flash, and described Flash as "buggy". Adobe's CEO Shantanu Narayen responded by saying, "If Flash [is] the number one reason that Macs crash, which I'm not aware of, it has as much to do with the Apple operating system."

Steve Jobs also claimed that a large percentage of the video on the Internet is supported on iOS, since many popular video sharing websites such as YouTube have published video content in an HTML5 compatible format, enabling videos to play back in mobile web browsers even without Flash Player.

=== Mainland China–specific variant ===
Starting with version 30, Adobe stopped distributing Flash Player directly to users from mainland China. Instead, they selected 2144.cn as a partner and released a special variant of Flash Player on a specific website, which contains a non-closable process, known as the "Flash Helper Service", that collects private information and pops up advertisement window contents, by receiving and running encrypted programs from a remote server. The partnership started in about 2017, but in version 30, Adobe disabled the usage of vanilla (global) variant of Flash Player in mainland China, forcing users to use that specific variant, which may pose a risk to its users due to Internet censorship by the Chinese Communist Party (CCP). This only affected Chinese Chromium based browser users, Firefox users, and Internet Explorer users using Windows 7 and below, as Microsoft still directly distributed Flash Player for Internet Explorer and Microsoft Edge Legacy through Windows Update in Windows 8 and upward at the time. Starting in 2021, however, this variant is the only publicly supported version of Flash Player.

== Release history ==
Adobe Flash Player version history
- FutureSplash Player 1.1
  - New scripting features
  - Option to disable the menu and memory management optimizations
- Macromedia Flash Player 2 (June 17, 1997)
  - Mostly vectors and motion, some bitmaps, limited audio
  - Support of stereo sound, enhanced bitmap integration, buttons, the Library, and the ability to tween color changes
- Macromedia Flash Player 3 (May 31, 1998)
  - Added alpha transparency, licensed MP3 compression
  - Brought improvements to animation, playback, digital art, and publishing, as well as the introduction of simple script commands for interactivity
- Macromedia Flash Player 4 (June 15, 1999)
  - Saw the introduction of streaming MP3s and the Motion Tween. Initially, the Flash Player plug-in was not bundled with popular web browsers, and users had to visit the Macromedia website to download it. As of 2000, however, the Flash Player was already being distributed with all AOL, Netscape, and Internet Explorer browsers. Two years later, it shipped with all releases of Windows XP. The installed base of the Flash Player reached 92 percent of all Internet users.
- Macromedia Flash Player 5 (August 24, 2000)
  - A major advance in ability, with the evolution of Flash's scripting abilities, as released as ActionScript
  - Saw the ability to customize the authoring environment's interface
  - Macromedia Generator was the first initiative from Macromedia to separate design from content in Flash files. Generator 2.0 was released in April 2001 and featured real-time server-side generation of Flash content in its Enterprise Edition. Generator was discontinued in 2002, in favor of new technologies such as Flash Remoting, which allows for seamless transmission of data between the server and the client, and ColdFusion Server.
  - In October 2000, usability guru Jakob Nielsen wrote a polemic article regarding the usability of Flash content entitled "Flash: 99% Bad". (Macromedia later hired Nielsen to help them improve Flash usability.)

The old Macromedia Flash Player logo

- Macromedia Flash Player 6 (version 6.0.21.0, codenamed Exorcist) (March 15, 2002)
  - Support for the consuming Flash Remoting (AMF) and Web Service (SOAP)
  - Supports ondemand/live audio and video streaming (RTMP)
  - Support for screenreaders via Microsoft Active Accessibility
  - Added Sorenson Spark video codec for Flash Video
  - Support for video, application components, shared libraries, and accessibility
  - Macromedia Flash Communication Server MX, also released in 2002, allowed video to be streamed to Flash Player 6 (otherwise the video could be embedded into the Flash movie).
- Macromedia Flash Player 7 (version 7.0.14.0, codenamed Mojo) (September 10, 2003)
  - Supports progressive audio and video streaming (HTTP)
  - Supports ActionScript 2.0, an object-oriented programming language for developers
  - Ability to create charts, graphs, and additional text effects with the new support for extensions (sold separately), high fidelity import of PDF and Adobe Illustrator 10 files, mobile and device development, and a forms-based development environment. ActionScript 2.0 was also introduced, giving developers a formal object-oriented approach to ActionScript. V2 Components replaced Flash MX's components, being rewritten from the ground up to take advantage of ActionScript 2.0 and object-oriented principles.
  - In 2004, the "Flash Platform" was introduced. This expanded Flash to more than the Flash authoring tool. Flex 1.0 and Breeze 1.0 were released, both of which used the Flash Player as a delivery method but relied on tools other than the Flash authoring program to create Flash applications and presentations. Flash Lite 1.1 was also released, enabling mobile phones to play Flash content.
  - Last official version for Windows 95/NT4 and Mac Classic
- Macromedia Flash Player 8 (version 8.0.22.0, codenamed Maelstrom) (September 13, 2005)
  - Support for runtime loading of GIF and PNG images
  - New video codec (On2 VP6)
  - Improved runtime performance and runtime bitmap caching
  - Live filters and blend modes
  - File upload and download abilities
  - New text-rendering engine, the Saffron Type System
  - ExternalAPI subsystem introduced to replace fscommand
  - On December 3, 2005, Adobe Systems acquired Macromedia and its product portfolio (including Flash).
- Macromedia Flash Player 8 (version 8.0.24.0) (April 23, 2006)
- Adobe Flash Player 9 (version 9.0.15.0, codenamed Zaphod and formerly named Flash Player 8.5) (June 22, 2006)
  - Introduction of ActionScript Virtual Machine 2 (AVM2) with AVM1 retained for compatibility
  - ActionScript 3 (a superset of ECMAScript 3) via AVM2
  - E4X, which is a new approach to parsing XML
  - Support for binary sockets
  - Support for regular expressions and namespaces
  - AVM2 donated to Mozilla Foundation as open-source virtual machine named Tamarin
- Adobe Flash Player 9 Update 1 (version 9.0.28.0, codenamed Marvin) (November 9, 2006)
  - Support for fullscreen mode
- Adobe Flash Player 9 (version 9.0.45.0) (March 27, 2007)
  - Support for Creative Suite 3.
- Adobe Flash Player 9 Update 2 (version Mac/Windows 9.0.47.0 and Linux 9.0.48.0, codenamed Hotblack) (June 11, 2007)
  - Security update
  - Last update for 95/NT.
- Adobe Flash Player 9 Update 3 (version 9.0.115.0, codenamed Moviestar or Frogstar) (December 4, 2007)
  - H.264
  - AAC (HE-AAC, AAC Main Profile, and AAC-LC)
  - New Flash Video file format F4V based on the ISO base media file format (MPEG-4 Part 12)
  - Support for container formats based on the ISO base media file format
  - Last version for Windows 98/ME and other platforms
- Adobe Flash Player 10 (version 10.0.12.36, codenamed Astro) (October 15, 2008)
  - New features
    - 3D object transformations
    - Custom filters via Pixel Bender
    - Advanced text support
    - Speex audio codec
    - Real Time Media Flow Protocol (RTMFP)
    - Dynamic sound generation
    - Vector data type
  - Enhanced features
    - Larger bitmap support
    - Graphics drawing API
    - Context menu
    - Hardware acceleration
    - Anti-aliasing engine (Saffron 3.1)
    - Read/write clipboard access
    - WMODE
- Adobe Flash Player 10 (version 10.0.32.18) (July 27, 2009)
- Adobe Flash Player 10 (version 10.0.42.34) (November 16, 2009)
- Adobe Flash Player 10 (version 10.0.45.2) (February 21, 2010)
- Adobe Flash Player 10.1 (version 10.1.52.14) (2010)
- Adobe Flash Player 10.1 (version 10.1.53.64, codenamed Argo) (June 10, 2010)
  - Reuse of bitmap data copies for better memory management
  - Improved garbage collector
  - Hardware-based H.264 video decoding
  - HTTP Dynamic Streaming
  - Peer-assisted networking and multicast
  - Support for browser privacy modes
  - Multi-touch APIs
  - For Macs/OSX 10.4 ppc or later
    - Using Cocoa UI for Macs
    - Use of a double-buffered OpenGL context for full-screen
    - Use of Core Animation
- Adobe Flash Player 10.2 (version 10.2.152.26, codenamed Spicy) (February 8, 2011)
  - Stage Video, a full hardware-accelerated video pipeline
  - Internet Explorer 9 hardware-accelerated rendering support
  - Custom native mouse cursors
  - Multiple monitor full-screen support
  - Enhanced subpixel rendering for text
- Adobe Flash Player 10.2 (version 10.2.152.32) (February 28, 2011)
- Adobe Flash Player 10.2 (version 10.2.153.1) (March 21, 2011)
- Adobe Flash Player 10.2 (version 10.2.159.1) (April 15, 2011)
- Adobe Flash Player 10.3 (version 10.3.181.14, codenamed Wasabi) (May 12, 2011)
  - Media measurement (video analytics for websites; desktop only)
  - Acoustic Echo Cancellation (acoustic echo cancellation, noise suppression, voice activity detection, automatic compensation for microphone input levels; desktop only)
  - Integration with browser privacy controls for managing local storage (ClearSiteData NPAPI)
  - Native control panel
  - Auto-update notification for Mac OS X
  - Last version for Mac OS X 10.5 and Windows 2000 (unofficially bypassing the XP installer)
  - Adobe replaced Extended Support Release 10.3 by 11.7 on July 9, 2013.
- Adobe Flash Player 10.3 (version 10.3.181.23) (June 5, 2011)
- Adobe Flash Player 10.3 (version 10.3.181.26) (June 14, 2011)
- Adobe Flash Player 10.3 (version 10.3.181.34) (June 29, 2011)
- Adobe Flash Player 10.3 (version 10.3.183.5) (August 14, 2011)
- Adobe Flash Player 10.3 (version 10.3.183.7) (August 24, 2011)
- Adobe Flash Player 10.3 (version 10.3.183.10) (September 21, 2011)
- Adobe Flash Player 10.3 (version 10.3.183.11) (November 11, 2011)
- Adobe Flash Player 10.3 (version 10.3.183.25) (September 18, 2012)
- Adobe Flash Player 10.3 (version 10.3.183.29) (October 8, 2012)
- Adobe Flash Player 11 (version 11.0.1.152, codenamed Serrano) (October 4, 2011)
  - Desktop only
    - Stage 3D accelerated graphics rendering
      - Desktop: Windows (DirectX 9), OS X (Intel processor only) and Linux (OpenGL 1.3), SwiftShader fallback
      - Mobile: Android and iOS (OpenGL ES 2)
    - H.264/AVC software encoding for cameras
    - Native 64-bit
    - Asynchronous bitmap decoding
    - TLS secure sockets
  - Desktop and mobile
    - Stage Video hardware acceleration
    - Native extension libraries
      - Desktop: Windows (.dll), OS X (.framework)
      - Mobile: Android (.jar, .so), iOS (.a)
    - JPEG XR decoding
    - G.711 audio compression for telephony
    - Protected HTTP Dynamic Streaming (HDS)
    - Unlimited bitmap size
    - LZMA SWF compression
  - Mobile only
    - H.264/AAC playback
    - Front-facing camera
    - Background audio playback
    - Device speaker control
    - 16- and 32-bit color depth
- Adobe Flash Player 11.1 (version 11.1.102.55, codenamed Anza) (November 10, 2011)
  - Last version of the web browser plug-in for mobile devices (made for Android 2.2 to 4.0.3)
  - iOS 5 native extensions for AIR
  - StageText: Native text input UI for Android
  - Security enhancements, last official version for Windows 2000 and XP RTM-SP1
- Adobe Flash Player 11.1 (version 11.1.102.62) (March 5, 2012)
- Adobe Flash Player 11.2 (version 11.2.202.228) (March 28, 2012)
- Adobe Flash Player 11.2 (version 11.2.202.233) (April 12, 2012)
- Adobe Flash Player 11.2 (version 11.2.202.235, codenamed Brannan) (May 3, 2012)
  - The Windows version offers automatic updater options
  - Dropped support of the browser plug-in for mobile devices (Android). Android app developers are encouraged to use Adobe Air, and Android web developers should switch to HTML5.
  - Extended support for Flash player 11.2 on Solaris, as it is the last version to be supported.
  - Adobe replaced Extended Support Release 11.2 on Linux with 24.0 on December 13, 2016.
- Adobe Flash Player 11.3 (version 11.3.300.257) (June 8, 2012)
- Adobe Flash Player 11.3 (version 11.3.300.262) (June 21, 2012)
- Adobe Flash Player 11.3 (version 11.3.300.265) (July 11, 2012)
- Adobe Flash Player 11.3 (version 11.3.300.268) (July 26, 2012)
- Adobe Flash Player 11.3 (version 11.3.300.270) (August 4, 2012)
  - Desktop and mobile
    - Fullscreen interactive mode (keyboard input during fullscreen)
    - Native bitmap encoding and compression (PNG, JPEG, JPEG-XR)
    - Draw bitmaps with quality (low, medium, high, best)
    - Texture streaming for Stage3D
    - Dropped support for Linux and Solaris
  - Mobile-only
    - Auto-orientation on specific devices
    - USB debugging for AIR on iOS
- Adobe Flash Player 11.3 (version 11.3.300.271) (September 18, 2012)
- Adobe Flash Player 11.3 (version 11.3.300.273) (October 3, 2012)
- Adobe Flash Player 11.4 (version 11.4.402.259) (August 10, 2012)
  - Flash Player only
    - ActionScript workers
    - SandboxBridge support
    - Licensing support: Flash Player Premium features for gaming
  - Flash Player and AIR
    - Stage3D "constrained" profile for increased GPU reach
    - LZMA support for ByteArray
    - StageVideo attachCamera/Camera improvements
    - Compressed texture with alpha support for Stage3D
    - DXT encoding
  - AIR only
    - Deprecated Carbon APIs for AIR
    - Direct AIR deployment using ADT
    - Push notifications for iOS
    - Ambient AudioPlaybackMode
    - Exception support in Native Extensions for iOS
- Adobe Flash Player 11.4 (version 11.4.402.265) (August 21, 2012)
- Adobe Flash Player 11.4 (version 11.4.402.278) (September 18, 2012)
- Adobe Flash Player 11.4 (version 11.4.402.287) (October 8, 2012)
- Adobe Flash Player 11.5
  - Shared ByteArray
  - Invoke Event enhancement (for openurl)
  - Packaging multiple libraries in an ANE (iOS)
  - Debug stack trace in release builds of Flash Player
  - Statistically link DRM (desktop only)
- Adobe Flash Player 11.6 (codenamed Folsom)
  - Lossless video export from standalone and authplay.dll
  - Support for flash.display.graphics.readGraphicsData() that returns a Vector of IGraphicsData
  - Improve permissions UI related to full-screen keyboard access
  - Prevent ActiveX abuse in Office documents
  - Support file access in the cloud on Windows
  - Enhance multi-SWF support
  - Migration certification for ANEs
  - RectangleTexture
  - File API update so AIR apps conform to Apple data storage guidelines
  - Separate sampler state for Stage3D
  - Set device-specific Retina Display resolution (iOS)
- Adobe Flash Player 11.7 (version 11.7.700.169, codenamed Geary) (April 9, 2013)
  - SharedObject.preventBackup property
  - forceCPURenderModeForDevices
  - Remote hosting of SWF files in case of multiple SWFs
  - Support for uploading 16-bit texture formats
  - GameInput updates
  - Android – create captive runtime apps
  - Adobe replaced Extended Support Release 11.7 on Mac and Windows with 13.0 on May 13, 2014.
- Adobe Flash Player 11.8 (codenamed Harrison)
  - Stage3D baselineExtended profile
  - Recursive stop on MovieClip
  - Flash Player & AIR Desktop Game Pad Support
  - Support for large textures (extendedBaseline, 4096)
  - Rectangle texture
  - DatagramSocket
  - ServerSocket
  - Substitute a redirected URL from a source URLRequest for part of the URL in a new URLRequest
- Adobe Flash Player 11.9 (codenamed Irving)
  - OS X Mavericks Support
  - Mac .pkg Installation Support
- Adobe Flash Player 12 (codenamed Jones) (November 14, 2013)
  - Improved Mac .pkg Installation Support for the workflow and UI
  - Support for Internet Explorer 11 on Windows 7
  - Support for Safe Mode in Safari 6.1 and higher
  - 64-bit PPAPI Flash Player for Google Chrome
  - Graphics: Buffer Usage flag for Stage3D
- Adobe Flash Player 13 (codenamed King)
  - Supplementary Characters Enhancement Support for Text Field
  - Full-screen video message tweak
  - As of 13 May 2014 this is the Extended Support Release.
- Adobe Flash Player 14 (version 14.0.0.125, codenamed Lombard) (June 10, 2014)
  - Stage 3D Standard profile
- Adobe Flash Player 14 (version 14.0.0.145) (July 8, 2014)
- Adobe Flash Player 14 (version 14.0.0.179) (August 12, 2014)
- Adobe Flash Player 15 (version 15.0.0.152, codenamed Market) (September 9, 2014)
  - Improved support for browser zoom levels
- Adobe Flash Player 15 (version 15.0.0.167) (September 23, 2014)
- Adobe Flash Player 15 (version 15.0.0.223) (November 11, 2014)
- Adobe Flash Player 16 (version 16.0.0.235, codenamed Natoma) (December 9, 2014)
  - Stage3D – Standard Constrained Profile
  - PPAPI Installers for Windows and Mac
- Adobe Flash Player 16 (version 16.0.0.257) (January 13, 2015)
- Adobe Flash Player 16 (version 16.0.0.287) (January 22, 2015)
- Adobe Flash Player 16 (version 16.0.0.296) (January 27, 2015)
- Adobe Flash Player 16 (version 16.0.0.305) (February 5, 2015)
- Adobe Flash Player 17 (version 17.0.0.134, codenamed Octavia) (March 12, 2015)
  - Control Panel improvements
  - Installer improvements for Mac
- Adobe Flash Player 17 (version 17.0.0.169) (April 14, 2015)
- Adobe Flash Player 17 (version 17.0.0.188) (May 12, 2015)
- Adobe Flash Player 18 (version 18.0.0.160, codenamed Presidio) (June 9, 2015)
  - Contains fixes for Adobe Security Bulletin APSB 15–11
- Adobe Flash Player 18 (version 18.0.0.194) (June 23, 2015)
- Adobe Flash Player 18 (version 18.0.0.203) (July 8, 2015)
- Adobe Flash Player 18 (version 18.0.0.209) (July 14, 2015)
- Adobe Flash Player 18 (version 18.0.0.232) (August 11, 2015)
- Adobe Flash Player 19 (version 19.0.0.185, codenamed Quint) (September 21, 2015)
- Adobe Flash Player 19 (version 19.0.0.207) (October 13, 2015)
- Adobe Flash Player 19 (version 19.0.0.226) (October 16, 2015)
- Adobe Flash Player 19 (version 19.0.0.245) (November 10, 2015)
- Adobe Flash Player 20 (version 20.0.0.228, codenamed Rankin) (December 8, 2015)
- Adobe Flash Player 20 (version 20.0.0.267) (December 28, 2015)
- Adobe Flash Player 20 (version 20.0.0.270) (January 1, 2016)
- Adobe Flash Player 20 (version 20.0.0.286) (January 19, 2016)
- Adobe Flash Player 20 (version 20.0.0.306) (February 9, 2016)
- Adobe Flash Player 21 (version 21.0.0.182, codenamed Sutter) (March 10, 2016)
- Adobe Flash Player 21 (version 21.0.0.197) (March 23, 2016)
- Adobe Flash Player 21 (version 21.0.0.213) (April 7, 2016)
- Adobe Flash Player 21 (version 21.0.0.216) (April 8, 2016)
- Adobe Flash Player 21 (version 21.0.0.226) (April 21, 2016)
- Adobe Flash Player 21 (version 21.0.0.242) (May 12, 2016)
- Adobe Flash Player 22 (version 22.0.0.185, codenamed Townsend) (June 16, 2016)
- Adobe Flash Player 22 (version 22.0.0.209) (July 12, 2016)
- Adobe Flash Player 22 (version 22.0.0.210) (July 14, 2016)
- Adobe Flash Player 23 (version 23.0.0.162, codenamed Underwood) (September 13, 2016)
- Adobe Flash Player 23 (version 23.0.0.185) (October 11, 2016)
- Adobe Flash Player 23 (version 23.0.0.205) (October 26, 2016)
- Adobe Flash Player 23 (version 23.0.0.207) (November 8, 2016)
- Adobe Flash Player 24 (version 24.0.0.186, codenamed Van Ness) (December 13, 2016)
- Adobe Flash Player 24 (version 24.0.0.194) (January 10, 2017)
- Adobe Flash Player 24 (version 24.0.0.221) (February 14, 2017)
- Adobe Flash Player 25 (version 25.0.0.127, codenamed Webster) (March 14, 2017)
- Adobe Flash Player 25 (version 25.0.0.148) (April 11, 2017)
- Adobe Flash Player 25 (version 25.0.0.163) (April 20, 2017)
- Adobe Flash Player 25 (version 25.0.0.171) (May 9, 2017)
- Adobe Flash Player 26 (version 26.0.0.126, codenamed York) (June 13, 2017)
- Adobe Flash Player 26 (version 26.0.0.131) (June 16, 2017)
- Adobe Flash Player 26 (version 26.0.0.137) (July 11, 2017)
- Adobe Flash Player 26 (version 26.0.0.151) (August 8, 2017)
- Adobe Flash Player 27 (version 27.0.0.130, codenamed Zoe) (September 12, 2017)
- Adobe Flash Player 27 (version 27.0.0.159) (October 10, 2017)
- Adobe Flash Player 27 (version 27.0.0.170) (October 16, 2017)
- Adobe Flash Player 27 (version 27.0.0.183) (October 25, 2017)
- Adobe Flash Player 27 (version 27.0.0.187) (November 14, 2017)
- Adobe Flash Player 28 (version 28.0.0.126, codenamed Atka) (December 12, 2017)
- Adobe Flash Player 28 (version 28.0.0.137) (January 9, 2018)
- Adobe Flash Player 28 (version 28.0.0.161) (February 6, 2018)
- Adobe Flash Player 29 (version 29.0.0.113) (March 13, 2018)
- Adobe Flash Player 29 (version 29.0.0.140) (April 10, 2018)
- Adobe Flash Player 29 (version 29.0.0.171) (May 8, 2018)
- Adobe Flash Player 30 (version 30.0.0.113) (June 7, 2018)
- Adobe Flash Player 30 (version 30.0.0.134) (July 10, 2018)
- Adobe Flash Player 30 (version 30.0.0.154) (August 14, 2018)
- Adobe Flash Player 31 (version 31.0.0.108) (September 11, 2018)
- Adobe Flash Player 31 (version 31.0.0.122) (October 9, 2018)
- Adobe Flash Player 31 (version 31.0.0.148) (November 13, 2018)
- Adobe Flash Player 32 (version 32.0.0.101) (December 5, 2018)
- Adobe Flash Player 32 (version 32.0.0.114) (January 8, 2019)
- Adobe Flash Player 32 (version 32.0.0.142) (February 12, 2019)
- Adobe Flash Player 32 (version 32.0.0.156) (March 12, 2019)
- Adobe Flash Player 32 (version 32.0.0.171) (April 9, 2019)
- Adobe Flash Player 32 (version 32.0.0.192) (May 14, 2019)
- Adobe Flash Player 32 (version 32.0.0.207) (June 11, 2019)
- Adobe Flash Player 32 (version 32.0.0.223) (July 9, 2019)
- Adobe Flash Player 32 (version 32.0.0.238) (August 13, 2019)
- Adobe Flash Player 32 (version 32.0.0.255) (September 10, 2019)
- Adobe Flash Player 32 (version 32.0.0.270) (October 9, 2019)
- Adobe Flash Player 32 (version 32.0.0.293) (November 12, 2019)
- Adobe Flash Player 32 (version 32.0.0.303) (December 10, 2019)
- Adobe Flash Player 32 (version 32.0.0.314) (January 14, 2020)
- Adobe Flash Player 32 (version 32.0.0.321) (January 21, 2020)
- Adobe Flash Player 32 (version 32.0.0.330) (February 11, 2020)
- Adobe Flash Player 32 (version 32.0.0.344) (March 10, 2020)
- Adobe Flash Player 32 (version 32.0.0.363) (April 14, 2020)
- Adobe Flash Player 32 (version 32.0.0.371) (May 12, 2020)
- Adobe Flash Player 32 (version 32.0.0.387) (June 9, 2020)
  - Refuses to play Flash content after January 12, 2021, and instead displays a static warning message.
- Adobe Flash Player 32 (version 32.0.0.403) (July 14, 2020)
- Adobe Flash Player 32 (version 32.0.0.414) (August 11, 2020)
- Adobe Flash Player 32 (version 32.0.0.433) (September 8, 2020)
- Adobe Flash Player 32 (version 32.0.0.445) (October 13, 2020)
- Adobe Flash Player 32 (version 32.0.0.453) (November 10, 2020)
- Adobe Flash Player 32 (version 32.0.0.465) (December 8, 2020)
  - Final global variant update.

== See also ==
- Adobe AIR
- Adobe Shockwave
- Apache Flex
- Java applet
- Microsoft Silverlight
- Ruffle (software) (WASM [web] targeting reimplementation of Adobe Flash Player)
