= Adobe AIR =

Cross-platform runtime system for building rich web applications

- Original author: Adobe
- Developers: Adobe; Wipro
- Release: February 25, 2008; 18 years ago
- Stable release: 51.3.1.1 / 12 February 2026; 8 months ago
- Operating system: Microsoft Windows; macOS and iOS; Android; BlackBerry Tablet OS; BlackBerry 10 (discontinued since OS 10.3.1); Linux (discontinued since v2.6)
- Platform: IA-32, x86-64, ARM, and MIPS
- Available in: Chinese Simplified, Chinese Traditional, Czech, Dutch, English, French, German, Italian, Japanese, Korean, Polish, Portuguese (Brazilian), Russian, Spanish, Swedish, and Turkish
- Type: Runtime environment
- License: Proprietary
- Website: airsdk.wxlift.com//

Adobe AIR (also known as Adobe Integrated Runtime and codenamed Apollo) is a cross-platform runtime system currently developed by Harman International, in collaboration with Adobe, for building desktop applications and mobile applications, programmed using Adobe Animate, ActionScript, and optionally Apache Flex. It was originally released in 2008. The runtime supports installable applications on Windows, macOS, and mobile operating systems, including Android, iOS, and BlackBerry Tablet OS.

AIR is a runtime environment that allows Adobe Animate content and ActionScript 3.0 coders to construct applications and video games that run as a stand-alone executable and behave similarly to a native application on supported platforms. An HTML5 application used in a browser does not require installation, while AIR applications require installation from an installer file (Windows and OS X) or the appropriate App Store (iOS and Android). AIR applications have unrestricted access to local storage and file systems, while browser-based applications only have access to individual files selected by users.

AIR internally uses a shared codebase with the Flash Player rendering engine and ActionScript 3.0 as the primary programming language. Applications must specifically be built for AIR to use additional features provided, such as multi-touch, file system integration, native client extensions, integration with Taskbar or Dock, and access to accelerometer and GPS devices. HTML5 applications may run on the WebKit engine included in AIR.

Notable applications built with Adobe AIR include eBay Desktop, Pandora One desktop, TweetDeck, the former Adobe Media Player, Angry Birds, and Machinarium, among other multimedia and task management applications. According to Adobe, over 100,000 unique applications have been built on AIR, and over 1 billion installations of the same were logged from users across the world, as of May 2014. Adobe AIR was voted as the Best Mobile Application Development product at the Consumer Electronics Show for two consecutive years (CES 2014 and CES 2015).

In June 2019, Adobe announced it would begin transitioning ongoing support and development of Adobe AIR to Harman. Adobe continued to provide support for versions 32 and earlier until the end of 2020, as support would be managed by Harman.

== Features ==
Using AIR, developers can access functionality including text, vector graphics, raster graphics, video, audio, camera, and microphone capability. AIR also includes additional features such as file system integration, native client extensions, desktop integration and access to connected devices. AIR enables applications to work with data in different ways, including using local files, local SQLite databases (for which AIR has built-in support), a database server, or the encrypted local store included with AIR.

Developers can access additional functionality by building AIR Native Extensions, which can access full device functionality being programmed in the native language.

=== Desktop features ===
On desktop platforms, AIR supports:

- Window management – Opening multiple windows, minimizing, maximizing and resizing AIR windows.
- Menu bar – Adding a native menu bar to AIR windows, with sub menus and custom menu items.
- File management – Discovering drives, files and folders on the PC, creating and deleting files, renaming, copying and moving files.
- Console applications – Executing native applications with command-line arguments, and receiving feedback via standard I/O & error streams.
- Multithreading – Managing multiple threads, to execute ActionScript 3 code in the background without freezing the user interface.
- Web browser – View HTML web pages with full CSS and JavaScript support within applications, with the integrated WebKit-based web browser.
- Clipboard access – Programmatically copy or paste text, bitmaps or files into the system clipboard.
- Drag-and-drop – Allows users to drag text, bitmaps or files into AIR applications.

=== Mobile features ===
On mobile platforms, AIR supports many mobile hardware features:

- 3D hardware-accelerated graphics rendering (using Stage3D)
- Touch-screen events (including multi-touch gestures)
- Device camera and microphone access (including video encoding for recorded video)
- Accelerometer and geo-location sensor input (GPS or otherwise)
- Networking with HTTP, TCP and UDP protocols
- AIR Gamepad - allows mobile applications to serve as secondary displays and controllers for games.

=== 3D graphics ===
In 2011, the addition of Stage3D allowed AIR apps access to GPUs for hardware acceleration. Several third-party frameworks have been developed to build upon the functionality of Stage3D, including the Starling Framework and Away3D. These frameworks are also compatible with AIR, and provide vital performance improvements to AIR apps published for mobile devices.

=== AIR Native Extensions ===
AIR apps can be augmented in functionality with the usage of AIR Native Extensions (ANEs). Native extensions are plug-in code libraries that contain native code wrapped with an ActionScript API, allowing developers to access native features not otherwise usable in AIR, such as Apple Game Center or Google Cloud Messaging.

Native extensions may be developed by anyone using publicly available tools; some are distributed for free or even as open source, while others are sold commercially.

Native extensions may be programmed in the native language on each platform, allowing access to the full set of platform APIs provided by the developer. (C++ for Windows, Java and C++ for Android, Objective-C for iOS).

== Availability ==
AIR is a cross-platform technology and AIR applications can be repackaged with few or no changes for many popular desktop and mobile platforms. Different installation options exist for each platform.

AIR applications may be published with or without the AIR runtime. Applications packaged with the AIR runtime are larger in file size, and are known as "captive runtime" applications. If the runtime is not embedded in the app, it must be installed separately.

In January 2009, Adobe claimed that there were over 100 million installations of Adobe AIR worldwide, and that "the majority of AIR runtime installations occur at the time the first AIR application is installed by a user". In May 2014, Adobe claimed that over 100,000 unique applications were built on AIR, and over 1 billion installations of the same were logged from users across the world.

=== Platforms ===
Adobe AIR, version 32, contains Adobe Flash Player 32, and is available for Windows 7 and later, as well as OS X 10.9 and later. Desktop Linux distributions were available until June 2011 with version 2.6, which ended Linux support.

Adobe AIR applications can be published as native phone applications on certain mobile operating systems, such as Android (ARM Cortex-A8 and above) and Apple iOS. In May 2017, Adobe stopped releasing AIR for Android, and the app was eventually removed from the Play Store in September 2018, but it can still be downloaded through their website. After Adobe's transition of AIR to Harman, they resumed support for Android and the latest version is only available there.

Platform	Installer file support	App store support
Windows	.air, .exe and .msi	None
macOS	.air and .dmg	App Store (with captive runtime)
Android	.apk	Google Play
iOS	.ipa	App Store
Playbook	.bar	App World

The following table explains to what extent Adobe AIR can run on various mobile operating systems:

Operating system	Prerequisites	Latest Adobe Flash Player	AIR Framework
Android	Android 2.3+, ARM Cortex-A8+ or Android x86	AIR 3.6.0.597 (uses Flash Player 11.6)	Option 1: The AIR player can be embedded as a 'captive' runtime, which increases APK size but makes the application standalone. Option 2: The runtime is not included with the app, and must installed as a separate app from the app market.
Apple iOS	iOS 4.3 or later	AIR 3.6.0.597 (uses Flash Player 11.6)	Not applicable: each app includes its own 'captive' runtime.
BlackBerry Tablet OS	None	AIR 3.1 (uses Flash Player 11.1)	Already pre-installed on each device.
BlackBerry 10	Blackberry 10.2 and lower (no longer supported from 10.3)	AIR 3.5 (uses Flash Player 11.1)	Already pre-installed on each device.

== Application development ==
AIR runs applications within a contained Flash Player instance. It runs web applications via WebKit rendering engine. Multiple instances of the browser can be started within a single AIR application, but JavaScript content executes with some security limitations.

AIR does not provide direct access to native GUI elements such as navigation bars or controls. Native extensions can be used to access additional native resources.

=== Development tools ===
==== SDK ====
The AIR SDK is available as a free standalone download for software developers to make AIR applications. SDK users do not need to install any commercial software to use the SDK, although several options are available. AIR apps can be compiled from the command line using the AIR compiler included in the SDK; the compiler can also be called from an IDE to eliminate the need for the command line.

AIR can also be used with Adobe Flex. Flex is an integrated collection of stylable graphical user interface, data manipulation and networking components, and applications built upon it are known as "Flex" applications. Flex GUIs are defined in MXML, similar to how Android and Microsoft Visual Studio define GUIs; however, Flex does not give access to native GUI components.

AIR applications built without the Flex framework allow greater flexibility and performance, and are known as "pure ActionScript" applications. Video games built on the AIR platform are typically pure-Actionscript projects. Various open-source component frameworks are available for pure ActionScript projects, such as MadComponents, that provide UI Components at significantly smaller SWF file sizes.

==== Software ====
Adobe distributes three commercial software products for developing of AIR applications in ActionScript:

- Adobe Flash Builder (enterprise application development and debugging)
- Adobe Animate (graphics design, animation and scripting toolset)
- Adobe Scout (visual profiler for performance optimization)

Third-party development environments that target the AIR runtime are also available, including:

- Moonshine IDE, a free IDE built with Apache Flex and Adobe Air. It can be used to create ActionScript 3, Apache Flex, Apache Royale and Feathers projects from Moonshine. It also provides cloud support.
- FlashDevelop, an open-source Flash ActionScript IDE, which includes a debugger for AIR applications
- Powerflasher FDT, a commercial ActionScript IDE
- CodeDrive, an extension to Microsoft Visual Studio 2010 for ActionScript 3 development and debugging
- IntelliJ IDEA, a commercial IDE supporting ActionScript 3 development and debugging
- AS3 & MXML for VSCode, a powerful extension capable to turn the popular Microsoft free editor Visual Studio Code in a complete AIR IDE

Adobe Flash Builder is the premium tool for Flex application development, since it includes an integrated drag-and-drop user interface builder, not found in competing tools like FlashDevelop.

=== JavaScript applications ===
Adobe provides for AIR, HTML5 and JavaScript development with Adobe Dreamweaver CS5, although any other HTML editor or text editor can be used.

AIR can run a subset of JavaScript, with no ability to dynamically execute code when running in the application sandbox. According to Adobe, this restriction is designed to prevent malicious remote content from attacking a user's system. Because of this restriction, JavaScript frameworks that make use of dynamic JavaScript functions like eval() were not initially compatible with AIR. However, several frameworks including Dojo Toolkit, jQuery, and ExtJS were updated to run in AIR's application sandbox. Some frameworks like MooTools were already compatible.

Dreamweaver CS4/CS3 requires an additional extension to compile AIR applications, as does Flash CS3 in the form of an update.
