= Adobe Wallaby =

Digital file converter application

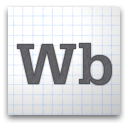
- Developer: Adobe Systems
- Stable release: 1.0 / May 30, 2012
- Operating system: Windows, macOS

Adobe Wallaby is an application that turns FLA files into HTML5. On March 8, 2011, Adobe Systems released the first version of an experimental Flash (FLA files) to HTML5 converter, code named Wallaby. It has been quickly superseded by various other Adobe tools.

== Support ==
Adobe Wallaby supports almost half of all the functions in Adobe Flash, such as, Gradients, Buttons, and Scenes. However, there are also some functions that it does not support, for example, ActionScript 1-3, and 3D transforms.

== Similar Tools ==
- Google Swiffy - A web-based tool developed by Google that converts SWF files into HTML5, using SVG for graphics and JavaScript for animation
- Ruffle, a free and open source Flash emulator that is actively developed.
- Mozilla Shumway, a discontinued Flash emulator written in JavaScript.
- CreateJS is library that while available separately was also adopted by Adobe as a replacement for Wallaby in CS6. Unlike Wallaby, which was a standalone program, the "Toolkit for CreateJS" only works as a plug-in inside Flash Professional; it generates output for the HTML5 canvas, animated with JavaScript. Around December 2013, the toolkit was integrated directly into Flash Professional CC.
- Adobe Edge Animate was designed to produce HTML5 animations directly.
