= UPIXO in Action: Mission in Snowdriftland =

2006 web game

Mission in Snowdriftland
- Developer: tons of bits
- Publisher: tons of bits
- Designers: Bogac Sariaydin, Steve Welz
- Programmer: Steve Welz
- Artist: Bogac Sariaydin
- Composer: Fabian Del Priore
- Platforms: Windows; Nintendo Switch
- Release: Adobe Flash; December 1, 2006; Adobe Flash re-release; December 1, 2010; Remaster; Windows; December 1, 2021; Nintendo Switch; November 29, 2024
- Genre: Platformer
- Mode: Single-player

Mission in Snowdriftland (originally known as UPIXO in Action: Mission in Snowdriftland) is a 2D platform game originally released as an online Adobe Flash game in 2006 and sponsored by Nintendo of Europe before being remastered and re-released on Steam, created by German studio tons of bits. The game was used as an advent calendar advertising various Nintendo products from December 1 to December 24, 2006, with an additional level added each day. It was supposed to be taken offline on January 14, 2007, but was delayed until January 16. The game was brought back on December 1, 2010, this time to promote upcoming WiiWare titles for the Wii, but once again removed in 2011.

A remaster of the game with new features, more content and technical updates was later released on Steam on December 1, 2021, with a Switch port following suit on November 29, 2024.

== Gameplay ==
While Mission in Snowdriftland plays like a traditional platformer, it can be also played as a digital advent calendar. Due to its history and concept the player can open a door each day of December and play one level per day until the final boss stage.

The game is divided into 4 worlds: Lake, Forest, Mountain, Cave. Each world has 6 stages, for a total of 24. Each stage contains 24 snowflakes. Once the player collects all 576 snowflakes (24 in 24 levels) a huge Bonus Level gets unlocked.

At the end of each world a miniboss stage is accessible. Beating the miniboss will clear the way for the next world. The miniboss of world 4 (cave) however will unlock the endboss stage, where Chubby will take on villain El Pix in a final battle.

At first, Chubby can only take 3 hits before he dies. A few levels contain hidden power-ups such as extra heart containers, which will add a permanent extra heart to Chubby's life meter.

== Storyline ==
El Pix, an evil penguin, has stolen video game artifacts from the secret archive of Video Game World, and made off with them to his lair in Snowdriftland. UPIXO (United Pixelheroes Organisation) has no clue what to do, seeing as the region is far too cold for anybody to survive. However, UPIXO boss Chief Tapir's assistant, Professor Schwabbel, spots Chubby Snow, a snowman video game character, who is complaining at the front desk because all his video game roles have been bad so far. It now depends on Chubby to get back the stolen artifacts.

In the original Flash version, the only difference was that El Pix has stolen game files from the Human World.

== Restoration ==
Technical upgrades for the Steam version include remastered graphics (including characters, objects, and backgrounds), parallax scrolling, controller support and save game slots.

While the Flash game was no longer available due to limited accessibility, the game was still playable on the developer's website after January 16. The site was meant to be password protected, however this was non-functional due to a programming bug.

The flash game was re-released in the winter period of 2010 to promote indie games available on Nintendo's WiiWare online market, though it was subject to the same timed release window, making the game only accessible for a few more days.

Web browsers would also cease the use of Adobe Flash Player in December 2020, the framework Snowdriftland ran on. However, BlueMaxima's Flashpoint saved these experiences as well as reviving Snowdriftland, which is now playable in their catalogue.

A video made by YouTuber Nick Robinson, titled "Mission in Snowdriftland: Nintendo's forgotten Flash game", revealed that a remaster had been announced for a Steam release. This would be released in late 2021, with the developers porting it to the Nintendo Switch later that year.

== See also ==
- Chick Chick Boom
