= Browser game =

Video game played in a web browser

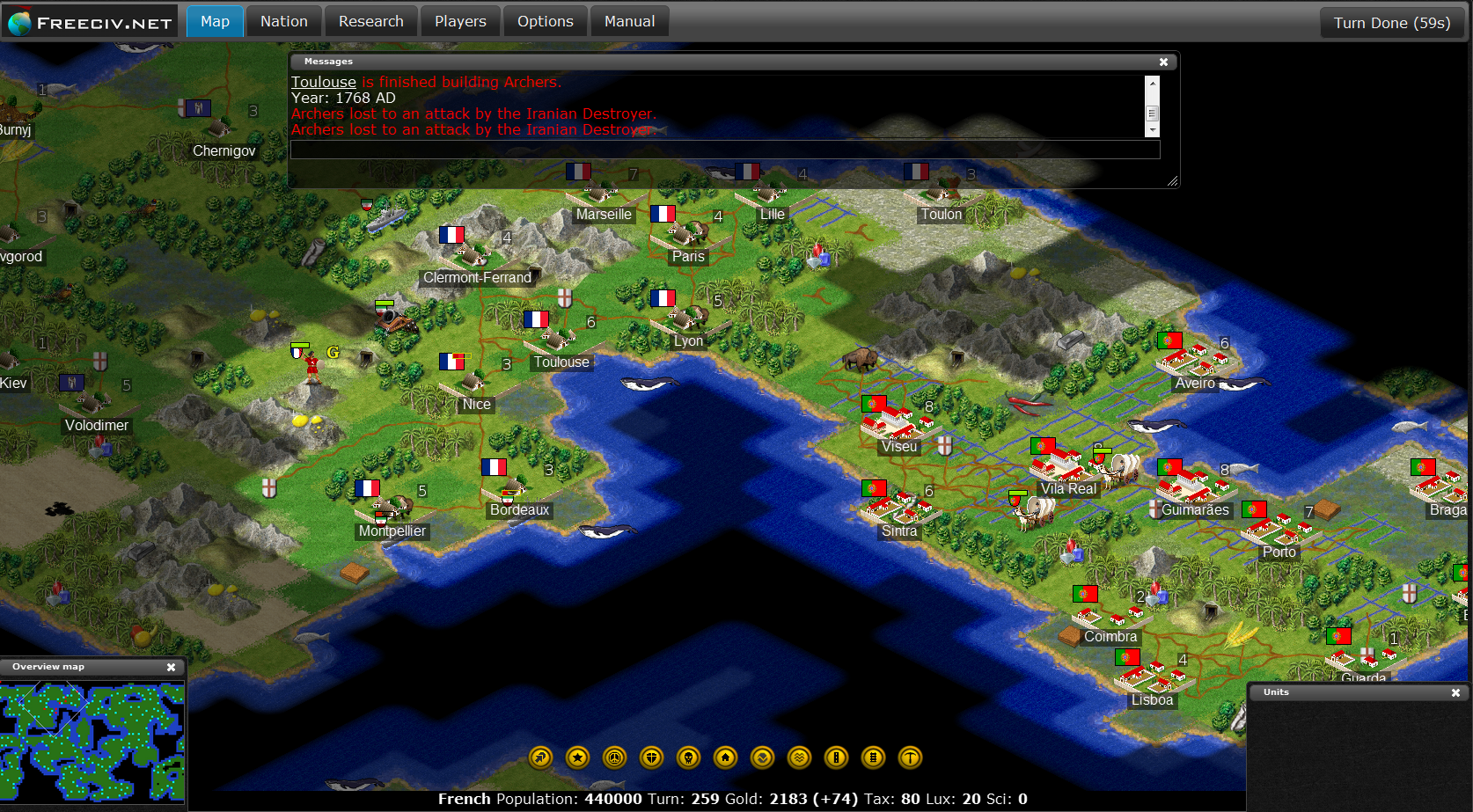
The browser version of Freeciv

A browser game is a video game that is played over the Internet using a web browser, typically without the need for dedicated hardware or software installation. They are sometimes referred to more specifically by their format, such as Flash games or HTML5 games. They are generally free-to-play and can be either single-player or multiplayer. It is not necessary to install a browser game; simply visiting the webpage will run the title in a browser. Some browser games were also made available as mobile apps, PC games, or console titles. However, the browser version may have fewer features or inferior graphics compared to the others, which are usually native apps.

Browser games have existed in various forms since the origins of the open internet in the 1990s. However, the 2000s were a "golden age" for the medium, and a great many were created with Adobe Flash during the period. The 2000s also saw the rise of social network games such as FarmVille, and the web ecosystem of the time was a "creative vortex" of rapid iteration and development, which had a huge influence on independent video games. Ultimately, the decline of Flash as a format and the rise of mobile gaming in the 2010s brought an end to the scene, though there have been more recent developments such as .io games.

== Format ==
The front end of a browser game is what runs in the user's browser. It is implemented with the standard web technologies of HTML, CSS, JavaScript, and WebAssembly. In addition, WebGL and WebGPU enable more sophisticated graphics. On the back end, numerous server technologies can be used. Many websites such as Newgrounds acted as platforms for hosting browser games.

Flash games operated using the Flash Player plug-in. Support for this outside of China was shut down on December 31, 2020, and since then playing these games has required unofficial methods, such as third party plug-ins. Thousands of Flash games have been preserved by the Flashpoint project. The emulation plug-in Ruffle aims to continue browser accessibility of Flash games.

== History ==
=== Early browser games ===
When the Internet first became widely available and initial web browsers with basic HTML support were released, the earliest browser games were similar to text-based multi-user dungeons (MUDs), minimizing interactions to what implemented through simple browser controls but supporting online interactions with other players through a basic client–server model. One of the first known examples of a browser game was Earth 2025, first released in 1995. It featured only text but allowed players to interact and form alliances with other players of the game.

Browser technology quickly began to mature in the mid-1990s with support for browser plug-ins and the introduction of JavaScript. More advanced browser interactions were now possible using client-side processing. Among other browser extensions, these new plug-ins allowed users to run applets made in the Java language and interactive animations created in Macromedia Flash. These technologies were initially intended to provide web page developers tools to create fully immersive, interactive websites, though this use fell out of favor as it was considered elitism and broke expected browsing behavior. Instead, these technologies found use by programmers to create small browser games among other unexpected uses such as general animation tools.

Sites began to emerge in the late 1990s to collect these browser games and other works, such as Sun Microsystems' HotJava. These sites started to become a popular commodity as they drew web visitors. Microsoft acquired one such site, The Village, in 1996, and rebranded it as the Internet Gaming Zone, offering various card and board browser games. ClassicGames.com was created in 1997 to host a selection of classic, Java-based online multiplayer games such as chess and checkers; its popularity led Yahoo! to purchase the site in 1998 and rebranding it as Yahoo! Games.

=== Flash era (1999–2010) ===
In 1999, Tom Fulp kickstarted the Flash games scene with the release of the game Pico's School on his site Newgrounds that featured a "complexity of design and polish in presentation that was virtually unseen in amateur Flash game development" of the time.

Many Flash games in the late 1990s and early 2000s received attention through the use of shock comedy or real-world events, like McDonald's Videogame, a satire of McDonald's' business practices, or Darfur is Dying, about the War in Darfur, Sudan. In 2017, Julie Muncy writing for Wired said, "Flash games lent themselves to the exaggerated and cartoonish, a style that eventually evolved into an affection-at least amongst its best creators-for beautiful grotesquerie. Like much of the younger gaming internet, Flash games defined boundaries simply to cross them; the best titles straddled a weird line between innocence and cruelty, full of gorgeous gore and enthralling body horror". In Pico's School, based on the Columbine shootings, the player must take down a goth school shooter. There are a few other controversies involving browser games and real-world events, such as the 2007 Virginia Tech shooting reenactment V-Tech Rampage, and NRA CEO Wayne LaPierre targeting the game Kindergarten Killers after the 2012 Sandy Hook shootings.

Expansion of broadband connectivity in the early 2000s drew more people to play browser games through these sites, as well as added attention as viral phenomenon. New sites like Kongregate and Armor Games arose for hosting Flash-based games while also offering their own titles, while companies like PopCap Games and King launched their own portals featuring titles they had developed. Social media sites also drove more players to browser games. Facebook, after launching in 2004, added support for browser game functionality that integrated with its social network features, creating social network games, notably with Zynga's FarmVille. The success of browser games did hurt some developers. Humongous Entertainment reported that they lost players to Flash games in the early 2000s.

==== Indie games ====
Browser games were an important platform for the emergence of indie games. In the late 1990s and early 2000s, the video game industry had started to coalesce around triple-A development, games made by large studios with multi-million dollar budgets. Because of the money involved, the industry took few risks in these major titles, and experimental games were generally overlooked. Browser games gave a venue for such titles during the early 2000s, and the broader interest in browser games by the mid-2000s highlighted several of these titles. Subsequently, a number of early indie games are those based on browser games, such as The Behemoth's Castle Crashers, inspired by Newgrounds' Alien Hominid and Edmund McMillen's Super Meat Boy based on his Meat Boy browser game. Other indie developers got their start in browser and Flash games, including Vlambeer, Bennett Foddy, and Maddy Thorson.

=== Decline of Flash (2010s) ===
Flash games peaked in popularity around the mid-2000s, and by the 2010s the format was in decline. This was due to two main factors: the rise of mobile gaming, which accelerated with the release of the iPhone in 2007, and Apple's 2010 announcement that the devices would not support Flash. The App Store and its in-app purchases were a new revenue model that emerged fairly quickly, and outpaced the ad-driven approach of the Flash era. Google used the same concepts for developing the Android storefront Play Store. Many developers either augmented browser games or shifted to the mobile platform to take advantage of the new revenue opportunities; notably, King transitioned one of its browser games into one of the most successful mobile games, Candy Crush Saga.

Steve Jobs' open letter to Adobe in 2010 stated that Apple would not support Flash on the iPhone platform due to security concerns and other factors. Critics pointed out that the move was made in order to promote Apple's own "walled garden" approach, and that Jobs personally "hated" Flash. The move gradually led to a long term deprecation of Flash, with Adobe announcing a move to the open HTML5 standard the following year, and developers gradually began to abandon the platform.

Some browser games did continue to be made in other formats throughout the 2010s, including HTML5, WebGL, and WebAssembly. Adobe announced the discontinuation of the format in 2017, and this took place in 2021. Projects such as the Flashpoint Archive exist for the preservation of these titles.

=== HTML5 games ===
The development and adoption of the HTML5 standard was a rulechanger for browser game developers.

The first experiments with new features, primarily the canvas element, allowed the developers to demonstrate, using the example of the early but popular and attractive games BrowserQuest and Contre Jour, that the capabilities of HTML5 as a technology are sufficient for developing projects that provide the player with a first-class gaming experience.

Since the introduction of HTML5 as a standard in 2008, the development games based on it has followed the path of mastering new emerging capabilities for rendering dynamic scenes - starting with the canvas element, which allowed in combination with JavaScript rendering of dynamic scenes and originally included in HTML5 specification, and also with WebGL (2011) and WebGPU (2021) technologies, both dramatically increasing developer capabilities.

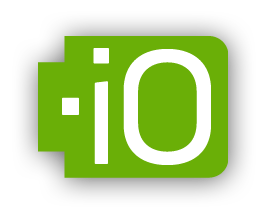
.io domain logo

=== .io games (2015–2021) ===
Agar.io was announced on 4chan on 27 April, 2015 by Matheus Valadares, a then 19-year-old Brazilian developer. In the game, players control one or more circular cells in a large map with many players, representing a Petri dish. The game went viral on the free online games site Miniclip, and began a wave of new .io titles, like slither.io, from around 2016- a new genre of large scale, arena based browser games, identifiable by their hosting at the .io domain.

=== Flash emulators (2021–present) ===
Following the shutdown of Flash, emulators have become a popular substitute to allow players to access old Flash games. Ruffle was released in January 2021 as an emulation-plug in to allow access to Flash games after its shutdown. Aside from Ruffle, other emulators such as Supernova and Flashpoint Archive have become commonly used to access Flash games.

== Original or popularised genres ==
Several game genres were either first developed as, or popularised by, browser titles. These include:

- Dress-up game – popularised via Flash games of the late 2000s.
- Endless runner – Some games as early as the 1980s had elements of this genre, but it was popularised by the browser game Canabalt in 2009.
- .io game – A genre of free, online multiplayer that gained popularity with the success of Agar.io in 2015. The games are usually characterized by simple graphics and gameplay in a free for all multiplayer arena. The term .io comes from the .io domain, which was originally assigned to the British Indian Ocean Territory but became popular for game developers due to its short and memorable nature.
- Social network game – Games that rely on social media networking. This originated in the late 2000s and led to break-out hits like FarmVille and Mafia Wars.
- Tower defense – Some elements of this genre had been present as early as Rampart (1990), but it was popularised by Flash based titles from the late 2000s. In particular, the Warcraft III mod Element TD was adapted for Flash in January 2007, and led to a wave of interest in the medium.

== See also ==
- List of browser games
- Virtual dress-up games
