= Moock =

Moock is a surname. Notable people with the surname include:

- Alastair Moock (born 1973), American singer-songwriter
- Colin Moock, Canadian writer, tutor, and programmer
- Joe Moock (born 1944), American baseball player

== See also ==
- Mock (surname)
