= Boom chick =

Boom chick and variants such as "chicka" may refer to:

- on and off beats (see back beat), as in Carter scratch
  - Boom Chicka Boom
  - bass and snare drum, as in beatboxing
- Chick Chick Boom
