= Adobe Edge =

Web development tool suite

- Developer: Adobe Systems
- Final release: CC / 24 September 2012; 14 years ago.
- Operating system: Windows 7 and later OS X 10.6 and later
- Type: Web development
- License: Bundled software
- Website: html.adobe.com/edge/

Adobe Edge is a discontinued suite of web development tools that Adobe Inc. started developing in 2011. The tools enhances the capabilities of other Adobe apps, such as Dreamweaver. The first app in the suite was the eponymous Adobe Edge, released in August 2011 as a multimedia authoring tool designed to succeed the Flash platform. In September 2012, Adobe renamed the app Edge Animate, and announced Edge Reflow, Edge Code, and Edge Inspect. Also packaged with the suite are Edge Web Fonts, the PhoneGap app, and an Adobe Typekit subscription. In October 2015, Adobe announced an end to the development of the Edge family. By the end of September 2019, all Adobe Edge products were removed from the Creative Cloud offering.

== Applications ==
=== Adobe Edge Animate ===
On August 1, 2011, Adobe announced the development of Edge as a new multimedia authoring tool to succeed the Flash platform for browser-delivered content, and released a preview version of the software. Edge builds applications based on a foundation of HTML5, JavaScript, jQuery and CSS3. These applications are compatible with iOS, Windows Phone 7 and other HTML5-compatible browsers.

=== Adobe Edge Code ===
A code-based HTML editor, Edge Code is designed to complement the other applications in the suite. It is built on the open-source Brackets app, which Adobe launched in June 2012. Rather than replacing Brackets, Edge Code is designed to make it more accessible, and integrate its functionality into existing Adobe applications. As with Edge Reflow, Edge Code is available as a public preview, launched alongside the announcement of the Edge suite. In November 2014 Adobe announced development of Code is discontinued and all Adobe's efforts will go into Brackets.

=== Adobe Edge Inspect ===
Edge Inspect, formerly Adobe Shadow, was developed as a way of quickly previewing a web design on mobile platforms without publishing the associated files to a server. It allows iOS and Android mobile devices to be paired to a computer, and each device will display the same site using its native render and presentation modes. Rather than previewing a site optimized for mobile viewing on a desktop machine, Edge Inspect sends the file to paired devices, where it is rendered and displayed. Code may be edited live, with changes being displayed on paired devices as they are made, and screenshots from all devices can be collected remotely from the computer that hosts the connection. It was released with the announcement of the Edge suite.

=== Adobe Edge Reflow ===
Edge Reflow is an application designed to allow for development of responsive web design. Similarly to Adobe Muse, Edge Reflow design is based on the visual layout of a web page, rather than the code that makes it up. This was a completely new tool, rather than a reworking of an old application, or one acquired by Adobe. The initial preview was made available to the public in February 2013, after being announced with the rest of the Edge suite in 2012.

== Services ==
=== Adobe Edge Web Fonts ===
Edge Web Fonts provides access to a collection of online fonts, available for use in web documents. These fonts are provided by Adobe, Google, and independent contributors. The service is integrated with the other Edge suite applications, allowing for a larger catalogue of fonts to be used in web development, whilst remaining compatible with all devices. It is also accessible via the Edge Web Fonts site, which generates the code necessary for inclusion in other sites. It is powered by Typekit, but does not provide the same service, and is completely free.

=== PhoneGap ===
PhoneGap is a mobile development platform that enables software programmers to build mobile apps using JavaScript, HTML5 and CSS3. Instead of device-specific languages such as Objective-C, applications are developed independently of their intended platforms, and then compiled and packaged as applications for a range of popular mobile operating systems, including iOS, Android, and Windows Phone.

=== Typekit ===
Typekit is a service which allows subscribers to embed fonts into online documents. Unlike Edge Web Fonts, Typekit requires a subscription, which provides access to the font library. The system was initially developed by Small Batch Inc., and purchased by Adobe in October 2011. A free subscription is available to the service, with a more comprehensive option costing an annual fee.

== Availability ==
The applications and services in the Edge suite are available as part of Adobe's Creative Cloud service. Subscription is free, although certain aspects are limited. A complete version, costing US$49.99 per month, is purchasable from Adobe, and lifts some of the restrictions placed on free subscribers. The complete subscription also comes with access to the other applications in the Adobe Creative Suite, along with 20GB of online storage, compared to the 2GB available to free users.

Creative Cloud
	Free	Complete
Edge Animate	Version 1.5 and earlier	Yes
Edge Code	Yes	Yes
Edge Reflow	Yes	Yes
Edge Web Fonts	Yes	Yes
Edge Inspect	One mobile device	Unlimited
PhoneGap	One private app	25 private apps
Typekit	Two fonts, one site	Unlimited
