= Spy Island =

Spy Island may refer to:

- Spy Island, a fictional island in the online role-playing game Poptropica
- Spy Island, one of four artificial islands in the Beaufort Sea, where exploratory oil wells are planned to be drilled
