= Cool Math Games =

Online browser games portal

- Screenshot A screenshot of www.coolmathgames.com on September 5, 2020.
- Website type: Online browser game portal
- Available in: English
- Headquarters: New York City, U.S.
- Area served: Worldwide
- Owners: Coolmath.com, LLC
- Industry: Education
- Parent: Sandbox Group
- Website: coolmathgames.com
- Advertising: Google Ads (with ad-free subscription available)
- Launched: 1997; 29 years ago
- Written in: PHP, HTML and Adobe Flash

Cool Math Games (branded as Coolmath Games) (Note: The name spelling is often alternated between, though this is the name used on company documents.) is an online web portal that hosts HTML and Flash web browser games targeted at children and young adults. Cool Math Games is operated by Cool Math LLC and first went online in 1997 with the slogan: "Where logic & thinking meets fun & games". The site maintains a policy that it will only host games that the operators believe are non-violent and educational.

In November 2018, its parent company, Constructive Media, LLC, was acquired by Sandbox & Co. (a division of Sandbox Group) from private equity firm H.I.G. Capital.

In November 2019, Popular Mechanics listed Cool Math Games as one of its "50 most important websites" since the internet was created.

In September 2022, Cool Math Coding was launched to teach kids how to code in Roblox and Minecraft.

== Cool Math Games guidelines ==
=== Content screening ===
According to the Cool Math Games Parents page, each game is reviewed by the site's internal games team before being published. The review process excludes any games that contain violence, blood, gore, alcohol or drug use, adult or sexual content, religious or political themes, or foul language.

=== Player safety and communication ===
Coolmath Games includes features to prevent direct communication or sharing of personal information among players. Freeform chat is not available in any game. In certain multiplayer titles, users can send emojis or select from a list of pre-screened phrases. Usernames in these games are automatically generated and do not contain personal information. The platform also states that users are never required to provide personal information, such as their real name or email address, to play games.

== History ==
=== Shutdown hoax ===
The planned discontinuation of Adobe Flash Player in 2020 prompted concerns about the future of websites built on the technology, including Cool Math Games. But Cool Math Games had already started to emulate flash games on to emulators like Ruffle, and add HTML5 games to the site. During mid-2019, there were rumors that stated that Cool Math Games was shutting down beginning in 2020 due to the end-of-life of Adobe Flash Player. In light of these rumors, a petition was created on Change.org to stop it from shutting down and gained 100,000 signatures.

=== Impact of the COVID-19 pandemic ===
During the COVID-19 pandemic, Cool Math Games popularity increased, having been played by students while they were in lockdown and self-isolating. The site's Alexa ranking also went up.

== Evolution of the platform ==
In the mid-2020s, Cool Math Games expanded beyond browser-based distribution by publishing games on the digital platform Steam. In December 2024, the company released Cool Math Games: The Game on Steam. This is a free-to-play title developed by Sideby Interactive. This was followed by TRACE: Definitive Edition, released in November 2025 and developed by STUDIO LOOK, which is a remastered version of the browser game TRACE.

== Reception ==
The Daily Dot called the website's library of content "impressive" in a rundown of the best games on the site. A review by Common Sense Media described the website as having "some" educational value in teaching math principles, but noted the site contained a substantial amount of ads.
