= Prized porker =

Prized porker may refer to:

- Pig, a genus of even-toed ungulates
- An item in the massively multiplayer online game Poptropica
