= Poptropica =

2007 online adventure game

- Developers: Jeff Kinney Group (formerly); StoryArc Media
- Publishers: Pearson Education (formerly); Sandbox Networks
- Designers: Pete Amomaur; Jeff Kinney
- Engine: Adobe Flash, Adobe AIR (original game); Haxe (HTML5 port); Unity (Poptropica Worlds)
- Platforms: Windows; macOS; Web; iOS; Android; Nintendo DS; Nintendo 3DS
- Release: June 5, 2007
- Genres: Educational, adventure, single-player with massively multiplayer online game elements
- Modes: Single-player, multiplayer

Poptropica is an online adventure game developed in 2007 by Pearson Education's Family Education Network and targeted towards children aged 6 to 15. Poptropica is primarily the creation of Jeff Kinney, later known as the author of the Diary of a Wimpy Kid series. As of 2015, he remained at the company as the Creative Director. The game primarily focuses on problem-solving through game quest scenarios, called "islands". Each island focuses on a problem that the player must resolve by going through multiple obstacles, collecting and using items, talking to various characters, and completing goals. All islands, upon completion, award "credits," which are non-negotiable currency that may be used to buy costumes and special effects in the Poptropica store.

In 2011, Poptropica was listed on Time magazine's list of "50 Websites that Make the Web Great", where it was described as "an inventive megasite for kids with a wholesome and slightly educational bent". By 2012, Poptropica had grown to have more than 75 million registered users, with 35 million in the 15-25 age group. Versions of the game have been released on Nintendo DS and 3DS, iOS, and Android mobile devices. In May 2015, it was announced that Family Education Network was sold by Pearson to the interactive-education venture capitalist Sandbox Networks, and that Poptropica had "over 3.2 million monthly unique users in 200 countries and territories".

In 2020, because of the discontinuation of Adobe Flash, Poptropica began porting its old islands that were built on Adobe Flash over to an HTML5 format. As a result of Poptropica's utilization of varying Flash engines, these islands were unable to be ported immediately, so they were effectively removed from the game. Fan archivists later made 35 islands available once again via the Basilisk browser within the Flashpoint program.

In April 2022, Poptropica announced that some of their old islands would return as part of a bundle on Steam. Though delayed by a day, the game was released on May 26, 2022 and includes seventeen islands and Poptropica Realms.

In 2024, Poptropica announced that their islands would permanently be migrated over on Coolmath Games while remaining playable on Steam and mobile.

== Game ==
Poptropica's previous login page, including Dr. Hare, a recurring antagonist and semi-mascot.

When the game was first launched in 2007, it only had one island. By 2017, however, it had 58 islands to be explored, all of which had a different theme. These examples included Back Lot Island, where the player helped produce a movie, and Super Power Island, where their goal was to defeat six super villains. Each island had its own quests, in which a player could receive an island medallion as well as 150 credits to spend in the in-game Poptropica Store. Starting July 6, 2011, Poptropica allowed players to replay islands without creating a new account, while they could still keep track of all Medallions they had earned.

=== Advertisements ===
In addition to the available island quests, advertisers contract for temporary mini-games that appear on the site, which are targeted to players of a certain age group or gender. Regular advertisers included Disney, Kellogg's Froot Loops, Lego toys, and various animated movie releases. Advertisement mini-games normally appear only during a two-week period. If the player completes an advertisement mini-game, they receive a temporary prize, usually related to the media being advertised.

A few Poptropica islands are themed after certain book series: these include Big Nate ("Big Nate Island"), Timmy Failure ("Timmy Failure Island"), Diary of a Wimpy Kid ("Wimpy Wonderland" and "Wimpy Boardwalk Island"), Magic Tree House ("Red Dragon Island"), and Charlie and the Chocolate Factory ("Charlie and the Chocolate Factory Island"). These islands are permanent, and can be played at any time. In 2015, a total of seven of these islands became members-only.

=== Mini-games ===
Poptropica features "head-to-head" mini-games in which users can play with other people. These include Switch, Sudoku, Hoops, Sky Dive, Paint War, Star Link, Balloons, Soupwords and Pathwise. The game keeps track of how many times the player wins or loses a certain mini-game.

== Spin-offs ==
=== Poptropica Adventures ===
In 2012, with partnership with Ubisoft, Poptropica released a video game for the Nintendo DS, titled Poptropica Adventures.

=== Poptropica: Forgotten Islands ===
On September 5, 2013, Poptropica launched Poptropica: Forgotten Islands, an iOS game, which allows players to meet new characters and discover story elements about Poptropica by finding artifacts littered throughout the game. It was also released on the Nintendo 3DS system through Ubisoft in 2014. It has been replaced on iOS and Android with a mobile version of the desktop Poptropica game.

=== Poptropica: Worlds ===
On January 11, 2017, Poptropica announced via their blog that they were introducing another game called Poptropica Worlds, developed in Unity. It was released in spring 2017. Poptropica Worlds had new features, such as redesigned characters, customizable homes, and new islands. Returning players could port over their avatar's look and name to Poptropica Worlds. Poptropica Worlds could be played on both the web and mobile. If membership was bought for Poptropica, it carried over to Poptropica Worlds, and vice versa. Poptropica Worlds was shut down in November 2022.
