= Adobe LiveMotion =

- Adobe LiveMotion 2 running on Windows 2000
- Developer: Adobe Systems
- Final release: 2 / January 7, 2002; 24 years ago
- Operating system: Windows NT 4.0 SP4 or later (version 1); Windows 98 or later (version 2); Mac OS 8.5 through 9.2.2; Mac OS X 10.0 through 10.6.8
- Type: Vector graphics editor (animation-focused)
- License: Proprietary
- Website: LiveMotion site.

Adobe LiveMotion was a product created by Adobe Systems released in 2000 and perceived as a direct competitor to Macromedia Flash. It replaced the discontinued Adobe ImageStyler program, which Adobe had sold from 1998 to 2000.

LiveMotion was used to create interactive animated graphics. It was able to export to a variety of formats, including QuickTime and Macromedia Flash. LiveMotion has an interface and motion timeline similar to After Effects and had the ability to share files across using the Adobe exchange file format.

Adobe released LiveMotion and LiveMotion 2.0 before discontinuing development November 15, 2003 because of poor sales due to fierce competition from its rival. In early 2005, Adobe and Macromedia announced that they would merge, which would likely have resulted in the LiveMotion project being scrapped anyway.

LiveMotion 2.0 (the final version)

== System requirements ==
=== Version 1 (2000) ===
Adobe LiveMotion 1.0 system requirements
Requirement	Minimum	Recommended
Microsoft Windows
Operating system	Windows 98, Windows 2000, Windows NT 4.0 Service Pack 4, Windows Me	
CPU	Intel Pentium II and later	
Memory	48 MB RAM	64 MB RAM
Free space	100 MB	
Input device(s)	Mouse and keyboard	
Apple Mac OS
Operating system	Mac OS 8.5, 8.5.1, 8.6, or 9.0; Mac OS X 10.0 through 10.4.11 using the Classic Environment	
CPU	PowerPC G3 and later	
Memory	48 MB RAM	64 MB RAM
Free space	100 MB	
Input device(s)	Mouse and keyboard	

Adobe LiveMotion 1.0 as Classic Macintosh software, it will not run on Mac OS X Leopard or later versions of macOS.

=== Version 2 (2002) ===
Adobe LiveMotion 2.0 system requirements
Requirement	Minimum	Recommended
Microsoft Windows
Operating system	Windows 98, Windows 2000, Windows Me, Windows XP	
CPU	Intel Pentium III and later	
Memory	64 MB RAM	128 MB RAM
Free space	50 MB	
Graphics hardware	800 × 600	1024 × 768
Input device(s)	Mouse and keyboard	
Apple Mac OS
Operating system	Mac OS 9.1 through v10.6.8	
CPU	PowerPC G3 and later	
Memory	64 MB RAM	128 MB RAM
Free space	50 MB	
Graphics hardware	800 × 600	1024 × 768
Input device(s)	Mouse and keyboard	

Adobe LiveMotion 2.0 as PowerPC software, it will not run on OS X Lion or later versions of macOS without the legacy Rosetta compatibility layer.
