= Lightspark =

Free and open source SWF player

- Developer(s): Alessandro Pignotti
- Stable release: 0.9.0 / February 16, 2025; 7 months ago
- Repository: github.com/lightspark/lightspark
- Written in: C++
- Operating system: Linux, FreeBSD, Windows
- Platform: IA-32, x86-64
- Size: 21 MiB (Win32), 22.8 MiB (Win64)
- Available in: English
- Type: Multimedia
- License: LGPLv3
- Website: lightspark.github.io

Lightspark is a free and open-source Adobe Flash (SWF) player released under the terms of the GNU Lesser General Public License (LGPL) version 3.

== Features ==
Lightspark supports most of ActionScript 3.0 and has an NPAPI plug-in. Though it has some support for it, it will fall back on Gnash, a free SWF player, on ActionScript 1.0 and 2.0 (AVM1) code.

Lightspark supports OpenGL-based rendering and uses OpenGL shaders (GLSL). The player is compatible with H.264 Flash Videos such as those on YouTube.

== Portability ==
The Lightspark player is completely portable. It has been successfully built on Ubuntu 11.04 (Natty Narwhal) on PowerPC, x86, ARM and AMD64 architectures. Lightspark has a Win32 branch for Microsoft Visual Studio and introduced a Mozilla-compatible plug-in for Windows in version 0.5.3.

== See also ==
- Mozilla Shumway
- Ruffle
