= Chick Chick Boom =

2007 video game

- Developers: Extra Toxic tons of bits
- Publishers: Nintendo of Europe tons of bits
- Designers: Bogac Sariaydin, Steve Welz
- Programmer: Steve Welz
- Artist: Bogac Sariaydin
- Composer: Fabian Del Priore
- Platforms: Flash, WiiWare
- Release: Flash; April 3, 2007; WiiWare: EU: October 29, 2010; NA: December 27, 2010; JP: December 21, 2010
- Genre: Artillery
- Modes: Single-player (Flash version); Multiplayer (Wii version)

Chick Chick Boom is an online Adobe Flash game created for Easter 2007 by German developer Extra Toxic and sponsored by Nintendo of Europe. The two companies had previously cooperated in a similar project called UPIXO in Action: Mission in Snowdriftland. The game launched on April 3, 2007 and was only playable through the month of April. After Extra Toxic took the game offline on April 30, 2007, a new version presenting new features and 3D visuals, was released on Q4 2010 for the Wii as a downloadable game for the WiiWare service.

== Gameplay ==
Chick Chick Boom is a single-player artillery game. The player commands a team of yellow-colored chicks and must use weaponry and defensive items to defeat the opposing team of black-colored chicks, led by a black Easter Bunny nicknamed the "Poster Bunny". To activate a weapon or defense item, the player needs to trace an image with a certain degree of accuracy for it to register and activate. Like Mission in Snowdriftland, Chick Chick Boom was scored by Fabian Del Priore.

The tutorial screen displaying what must be traced for each command

The chicks will bounce throughout their field aimlessly until given commands to maneuver or send attacks. The player selects a command and is then prompted to trace a simple outline in order to activate the command. Afterwards, the command cannot be used again until the icon representing it "refills." Some commands refill faster than others.

Each drawing is given an accuracy rating, and a drawing must have an accuracy rating of at least 70% to register at all. The higher the accuracy percentage, the more effective the command. Upon finishing the ten introductory levels, Pro Mode is activated, which is essentially an "endless play" mode where the Poster Bunny's chicks are revived immediately.

A wallpaper is rewarded to the player for the completion of each introductory level. They appear in the Download Center on the main menu and can be accessed at any time later. The wallpapers include Mario Hoops 3-on-3, Kororinpa, Pokémon Ranger, Wii Menu, Phoenix Wright: Ace Attorney − Justice for All, WarioWare: Smooth Moves, Hotel Dusk: Room 215, Wii Sports, Harvest Moon DS, and Diddy Kong Racing DS.

=== Offensive commands ===
- Weight - A shadow appears on the opponent's field where the weight will drop, and after a short delay, a large object will fall from the sky, crushing any chicks below. The more accurate the drawing, the larger and more damaging the object. Some items include television sets, elephants, safes and sofas with Chubby Snow from Mission in Snowdriftland sitting on them. If two or more chicks are crushed by the same weight, the player can launch two weights simultaneously on the next turn. If a player defeats multiple chicks with the same weight, one of the player's chicks will receive a hard hat, increasing their defense against future attacks.
- Bomb - A bomb is tossed into the opponent's field with a timer on the front of it. Upon reaching zero, the bomb will explode. The size of the explosion and the speed of the countdown correspond with the accuracy of the drawing, and a perfect drawing's explosion can almost fill the entire field. If all five of the opponent's chicks are hit with a single blast, one of the player's chicks will become a bomb defuser, allowing the chick to defuse any of the opponent's bombs by touching them. Water from rain and sprinklers will also automatically defuse any bombs.
- Lightning - Thunder clouds constantly drift over both fields. When one is present, the Lightning command becomes available. Lightning will brew within the cloud, and a short time later, it will strike every chick on the side of the battlefield it is floating over. The accuracy of the drawing can make increase the lightning's strength so much that it can defeat the entire team in a single strike.
- Toadstool - Poisonous mushrooms will appear on the opponent's field. If a chick touches them, they become green in color, their speed is dramatically lowered, and they lose small amounts of life constantly. The poison effect can wear off over time. The power of the mushrooms and quantity of them that grow corresponds with the drawing's accuracy.
- Balloon - A hot-air balloon appears on the opponent's field, and if a chick jumps into it, they will slowly drift into the sky. Once floating off the screen, the chick is automatically defeated. The size of the balloon corresponds with the accuracy of the drawing, and the bigger the balloon, the faster it will rise. Bomb explosions and lightning strikes can hit the chicks floating in the balloons and free them from their hold, and if caught under rain, the balloon will slowly descend.

=== Defensive commands ===
- Move - All of the player's chicks will move to the left or right side of their field. This command is vital in avoiding weights, bombs, and keeping out of balloons until they naturally float away on their own. The accuracy of the drawing will keep the chicks in that area of the field longer. Some chicks may also ignore the command if the accuracy is low.
- Lightning Rod - By activating this, an opponent's lightning strikes will redirect to the lightning rod, leaving the chicks unharmed. The accuracy of the drawing creates a larger lightning rod, and if the lightning rod is small, it may not be able to redirect all of the lightning's power, leaving some chicks open for damage regardless.
- Medicine - This command will heal any chicks under the effect of poisonous mushrooms. However, if the accuracy is too low, it may not fully heal them. Furthermore, the sun will occasionally shine on the player's field, usually following rainstorms. If the medicine command is activated in that brief moment, all of the player's chicks receive heavy life recovery.
- Sandbags - When a chick is trapped in a balloon, this command will place a sandbag on the balloon in an attempt to bring it back down to the ground. The size and weight of the sandbag depends on the accuracy of the drawing, and three sandbags total can be placed on a balloon. (Any sandbags drawn after the third are ignored.) A high accuracy balloon can be almost impossible to recover without three high accuracy sandbags to match it.

=== Other commands ===
Along with these commands, the player is offered the use of water sprinklers. Occasionally, a sprinkler will protrude from the player's field. By clicking on it with the cursor, water will cover the field, defusing any opponent's bombs. Furthermore, while the sprinkler is active, earthworms will crawl around the field. If a chick touches a worm, life is automatically recovered. Worms will also appear when a raincloud appears over either team's field.

== WiiWare ==
Chick Chick Boom made a transition to WiiWare with new features and full 3D graphics. The game was released in the PAL region on October 29, 2010, in Japan on December 21, 2010 and on December 27, 2010 in North America.

== Reception ==
Reception

Aggregate score
Aggregator	Score
GameRankings	71.00%

Review scores
Publication	Score
Destructoid	7/10
IGN	8/10
Nintendo Life	8/10
Nintendo World Report	6/10

Kotaku were not fond of the mouse interface for the drawing mechanic, but found it was an excellent Wii browser game and reasoned that a "multiplayer version would be perfect on the DS."

Nintendo Life stated that it was largely unchanged from the browser version but with some new mechanics, like the ability to charge an attack by tracing the outlines faster. They found the game to be very hectic, as well as enjoyable in both singleplayer and multiplayer.

== See also ==
- UPIXO in Action: Mission in Snowdriftland
