= Business Catalyst =

Adobe Business Catalyst
- Developer: Adobe Systems
- Release: April 12, 2010; 16 years ago
- Final release: R285 / 2017
- License: Trialware
- Website: businesscatalyst.com

Business Catalyst was a hosted (SaaS) all-in-one solution for building and managing business websites. It had sales, service, and marketing features such as eCommerce and Email Marketing tools. The company was founded in 2004 by two Australian entrepreneurs, Bardia Housman and Adam Broadway. It was acquired by Adobe Systems in August 2009.

== Business model ==
Business Catalyst's business model differed from others in that they allowed web designers to resell their hosted service as part of a "Partner Program".

A reseller channel of paid "Partners" received specialized tools for site provisioning and management, commissions on hosting fees, live training and in some instances ability to rebrand the platform as their own.

Business Catalyst experimented with a direct-to-customer strategy under the “GoodBarry” brand before the offering was closed down as a part of the Adobe acquisition.

== Platform features ==
The Business Catalyst platform incorporated features including:

- Content management
- eCommerce (catalog, payment gateway providers)
- Email marketing
- Web hosting for Adobe Muse website
- Integrated CRM database
- Reporting & analytics
- Social media integration

== History ==
- 2004 - Business Catalyst is released as a platform designed for building and managing online businesses.
- 2005 - Business Catalyst launches their Dreamweaver Extension “Triangle”, an early extension to provide real-time connectivity between Dreamweaver and a hosted service.
- 2006 - Business Catalyst launches service in Australia.
- 2007 - The company opens its retail "GoodBarry" brand, targeted towards do-it-yourself business owners.
- 2008 - Business Catalyst opens their first international office in San Francisco, USA.
- August, 2009 - Business Catalyst is acquired by Adobe Systems, closing down the GoodBarry brand to focus solely on the web professional market.
- April, 2010 - Adobe announces the opening of the first of three new datacenters for their Business Catalyst service
- May 2012 - Adobe includes base Business Catalyst hosting as part of the Creative Cloud platform.
- 24 March 2018 - Adobe announces that Business Catalyst will be shut down after March 26th 2020.
- 10 April 2018 - Adobe announces that Business Catalyst's shut-down will be extended to March 26th 2021.
- 27 March 2020 - Adobe announces that Business Catalyst's shut-down will be further extended due to Corona Pandemic to September 26th 2021.
- 26 September 2021 - Shut-down process commences
