= Xara Flare =

Xara Flare Open Vector File Format is a format that was introduced in 1997 by XARA to compete with the Macromedia Flash format. The format was open and developers could export from their products to this format, royalty free and without the need of any permission. The key characteristic and design goal was for a file format that was very compact for fast download over the internet. It supports a rich set of vector graphic primitives including a wide variety of graduated shading and graduated transparency.

The Xara Flare format was also the native file format used in the Xara X vector graphics software. In 2004, it was updated and renamed the Xar file format.
