= BlazeDS =

Open-source messaging protocol

- Developers: Apache Software Foundation and Adobe Systems
- Type: Messaging protocol
- License: LGPL v3 Apache-2.0
- Website: Apache BlazeDS; Adobe BlazeDS

BlazeDS is a server-based Java remoting and web messaging technology that allows users to connect to back-end distributed data and push data to Apache Flex and Adobe AIR Rich Internet applications (RIA). Because of its open licensing, BlazeDS is not precluded from being used with other client platforms, such as JavaScript/Ajax.

Previously available only as part of Adobe LiveCycle Data Services ES, on December 13, 2007 Adobe announced that the technologies included in BlazeDS, along with the Action Message Format specification, were contributed to open source under the GNU Lesser General Public License (LGPL v3) with the source code being available for download from early 2008. BlazeDS can be downloaded from the official page.

The Message Service provides a complete publish/subscribe infrastructure allowing Flex clients and the server to exchange messages in real time. Remoting allows a Flex application to directly invoke methods of Java objects deployed in an application server.

BlazeDS applications consist of client-side code and server-side code. Client-side code is typically a Flex application written in MXML and ActionScript and deployed as a SWF file. Server-side code is written in Java and deployed as Java class files or Java Archive (JAR) files.

== See also ==
- Flash Media Server
- Adobe Flash
