= Macromedia Flash 8 =

Authoring and animation program

- A screenshot of Macromedia Flash 8 running on Windows 11.
- Developer: Macromedia
- Release: September 13, 2005 (Professional); September 2005 (Basic)
- Operating system: Windows 2000 and XP through Windows 11; Mac OS X v10.3.0 through v10.6.8
- Successor: Adobe Flash Professional CS3
- Type: Animation, Rich Web Application development
- License: Proprietary

Macromedia Flash 8 is a multimedia authoring and animation program developed by Macromedia. Released on September 13, 2005, it was the final version of Flash to be released under the Macromedia brand before the company was acquired by Adobe Inc.. Flash 8 introduced new features aimed at improving graphic effects, animation, video integration, and content creation.

The software was available in two editions: Flash Basic 8 and Flash Professional 8. Flash Professional 8 included all the features of Flash Basic 8, plus additional functionalities for advanced users and developers. It was widely adopted by web designers and animators for creating interactive websites, animations, and rich web applications.

== History ==
Macromedia Flash 8 was released in 2005 as a successor to Macromedia Flash MX 2004. It was the last version developed and released by Macromedia, as Adobe Systems acquired the company in 2005. Following the acquisition, the next major release was rebranded as Adobe Flash CS3 Professional in 2007.

Flash 8 was considered a significant upgrade, introducing features that provided more creative control and enhanced performance for web-delivered content. It became a popular tool for creating the animated and interactive content that characterized many websites of the mid-2000s. Flash content were mostly uploaded to Newgrounds and Albino Blacksheep, known for their .swf support. It is also the most used version of Flash.

== Features ==
Flash 8 introduced a range of new features and improvements, many of which were focused on enhancing visual effects and providing more control to developers.

For graphics and animation, Flash 8 allowed developers to apply filters like drop shadows, blurs, and glows directly to movie clips and text at runtime. It also introduced 25 new blend modes for more complex visual compositing. The software provided greater control over the appearance of vector strokes, with new options for joins, caps, and scaling. A new object drawing model treated shapes as objects, preventing them from automatically merging when overlapped. Text rendering was improved with FlashType, a new engine that enhanced the quality and readability of small fonts. For animation, custom easing controls allowed for more precise, natural-looking motion by giving animators control over acceleration and deceleration.

Video capabilities were significantly enhanced. Flash 8 included a new high-quality video codec, On2 VP6, that offered superior video quality at smaller file sizes. The software also introduced support for 8-bit alpha channels in video, allowing for the creation of video with transparent backgrounds. A separate, standalone video encoder application was included, which supported batch processing of video files into the Flash Video (FLV) format.

In terms of development, Flash 8 continued to use ActionScript 2.0, an object-oriented programming language for creating complex interactivity. To help beginners, Flash 8 included Script Assist, a visual user interface for writing ActionScript code without needing to know the syntax. The Professional version also included emulators to test how content would appear and perform on various mobile devices.

== Editions ==
Macromedia released two distinct editions of Flash 8 to cater to different user needs and budgets.

- Flash Basic 8 is the entry-level version of the software, aimed at hobbyists and users with basic animation and interactivity needs. It included the core drawing, animation, and text tools.
- Flash Professional 8 is targeted at web designers, animators, and application developers. It included all the features of Flash Basic 8, and added advanced graphic effects like filters and blend modes, the high-quality On2 VP6 video codec with alpha channel support, a standalone video encoder, advanced ActionScript features with the Script Assist tool, and tools for mobile device emulation and authoring.

== System requirements ==
Macromedia Flash 8 system requirements
Requirement	Minimum	Recommended
Microsoft Windows
Operating system	Windows 2000 or later	
CPU	Intel Pentium III 800 MHz and later	
Memory	256 MB RAM (1 GB recommended to run more than one Studio 8 product simultaneously)	
Free space	710 MB	
Graphics hardware	1024 × 768 (XGA) with 16-bit display	1024 × 768 (XGA) with 24-bit Display
Input device(s)	Mouse and keyboard	
Apple Mac OS
Operating system	Mac OS X v10.3.0 through v10.6.8	
CPU	PowerPC G3 600 MHz and later	
Memory	256 MB RAM (1 GB recommended to run more than one Studio 8 product simultaneously)	
Free space	360 MB	
Graphics hardware	1024 × 768 (XGA) with 16-bit display	1024 × 768 (XGA) with 24-bit Display
Input device(s)	Mouse and keyboard	

Macromedia Flash 8 as PowerPC software, it will not run on OS X Lion or later versions of macOS without the legacy Rosetta compatibility layer.

== Reception and legacy ==
Flash 8 became a cornerstone of web development in the mid-2000s, with its player being one of the most widely distributed pieces of software on the internet. It was instrumental in the rise of user-generated content platforms like YouTube, which initially relied on Flash to deliver video content. The software was also widely used to create a vast number of web-based games and animations, contributing significantly to the internet culture of the time.

While the rise of HTML5, CSS3, and JavaScript, along with security concerns and lack of support on mobile devices, eventually led to the decline of Flash, Flash 8 is often remembered as one of the most stable and feature-rich versions of the software. It represents a peak in the era of Flash-dominated interactive web content.
