= Thoughts on Flash =

Open letter published by Steve Jobs

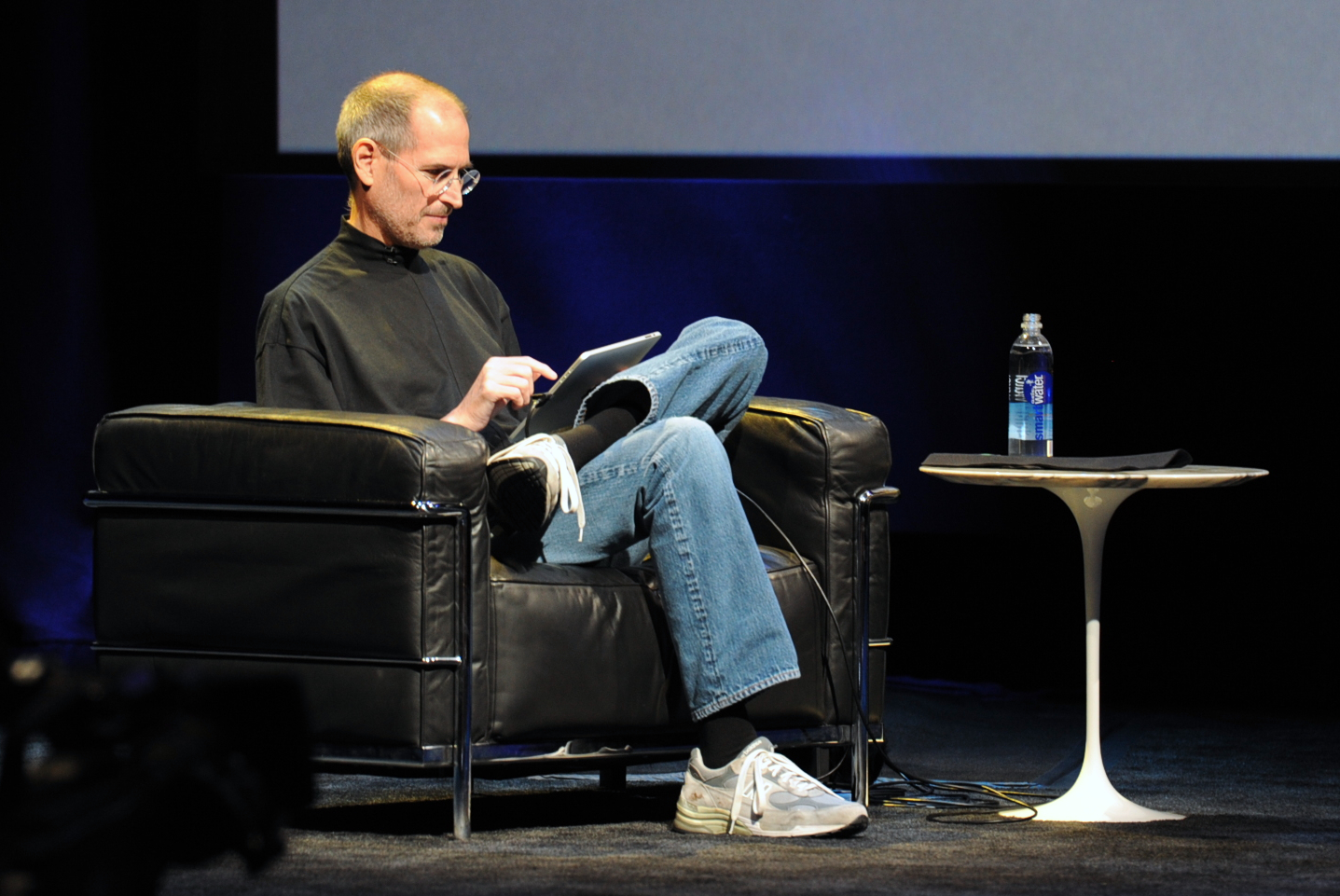
Steve Jobs in January 2010, a few months before the publication of "Thoughts on Flash"

"Thoughts on Flash" is an open letter published by Steve Jobs, co-founder and then-chief executive officer of Apple Inc., on April 29, 2010. The letter criticizes Adobe Systems' Flash platform and outlines reasons why the technology would not be allowed on Apple's iOS hardware products. The letter initially drew criticism, as well as accusations of falsehood, hypocrisy, and ulterior motive, but eventually gained praise and support.

== Letter ==
On April 29, 2010, Steve Jobs, the co-founder and then-chief executive officer of Apple Inc., published an open letter called "Thoughts on Flash" explaining why Apple would not allow Flash on the iPhone, iPod Touch and iPad. He cited the rapid energy consumption, computer crashes, poor performance on mobile devices, poor security, lack of touch support, and desire to avoid "a third party layer of software coming between the platform and the developer". He touched on the idea of Flash being "open", claiming "by almost any definition, Flash is a closed system". Jobs dismissed the idea that Apple customers are missing out by being sold devices without Flash compatibility by quoting a number of statistics, concluding with "Flash is no longer necessary to watch video or consume any kind of web content."

=== Response ===
The letter drew immediate attention. In response to Jobs' accusations, Adobe's CEO Shantanu Narayen described the open letter as an "extraordinary attack", and, during an interview with The Wall Street Journal, called the problems mentioned by Jobs' "really a smokescreen". He further fired back at Apple, stating that computer crashes were due to Apple's operating system, and that allegations of battery drain were "patently false". Various publications had different opinions on the topic. Wired's Brian Chen had in a 2009 article claimed Apple would not allow Flash on the iPhone for business reasons, due to the technology being able to divert users away from the App Store. John Sullivan of Ars Technica agreed with Jobs, but highlighted the hypocrisy in his reasoning, writing: "every criticism he makes of Adobe's proprietary approach applies equally to Apple". Dan Rayburn of Business Insider accused Steve Jobs of lying, particularly the sentiment that most content on the Internet is available in a different format.

Other publications agreed with Jobs. Ryan Lawler of TechCrunch wrote in 2012 "Jobs was right", adding Android users had poor experiences with watching Flash content and interactive Flash experiences were "often wonky or didn't perform well, even on high-powered phones". Mike Isaac of Wired wrote in 2011 that "In [our] testing of multiple Flash-compatible devices, choppiness and browser crashes were common", and a former Adobe employee stated "Flash is a resource hog [...] It's a battery drain, and it's unreliable on mobile web browsers". Kyle Wagner of Gizmodo wrote in 2011 that "Adobe was never really able to smooth over performance, battery, and security issues".

== iOS development ==
In April 2010, Apple announced changes to its iPhone Developer Agreement, with details on new developer restrictions, particularly that only apps built using "approved" programming languages would be allowed on the App Store. The change impacted a number of companies that had developed tools for porting applications from their respective languages into native iPhone apps, with the most prominent example being Adobe's "Packager for iPhone", an iOS development tool in beta at the time. The New York Times quoted an Adobe supporter alleging the policy to be anti-competitive.

On May 3, 2010, New York Post reported that the US Federal Trade Commission (FTC) and the United States Department of Justice (DOJ) were deciding which agency would launch an antitrust investigation into the matter.

In September 2010, after having "listened to our developers and taken much of their feedback to heart", Apple removed the restrictions on third-party tools, languages and frameworks, and once again allowed the deployment of Flash applications on iOS using Adobe's iOS Packager.

Via the iOS packager (and later tools), Flash was used for a number of popular iOS games and applications in the ensuing years, a fact which went largely unnoticed by users. It continues to be a compatible method for app development for iOS and the runtime remains in active development, though its popularity among developers never recovered.

On November 8, 2011, Adobe announced that it was ceasing development of the Flash Player plug-in for web browsers on mobile devices, and shifting its focus toward building tools to develop applications for mobile app stores.

In 2021, former Apple head of software engineering Scott Forstall said in a taped deposition in the Epic Games v. Apple lawsuit that Apple had once helped Adobe try to port Flash for iPhone and iPad. Performance was "abysmal and embarrassing", and Apple never allowed Flash to be released for iOS.

== Flash end of life ==
In July 2017, Adobe announced its intention to discontinue Flash (including security updates) altogether by the year 2020. As of December 31, 2020, Flash support has ended. Adobe blocked Flash content from running in Flash Player beginning January 12, 2021.

== See also ==
- Comparison of HTML5 and Flash
