= Colin Moock =

- Resting place: Toronto, Ontario
- Occupations: Programmer, Flash and ActionScript expert
- Writing career
- Notable works: Essential ActionScript 3.0 (2007), Essential ActionScript 2.0 (2004), ActionScript: The Definitive Guide (2001)
- Website: www.moock.org

Colin Moock is an Adobe Flash and ActionScript expert. He is an author, tutor, and programmer.

== Career ==
Moock studied at the Literature Department of the University of Waterloo, Canada. Colin worked as a webmaster for SoftQuad, Inc. (until 1997). For the next four years, he worked at the Canadian interactive Agency ICE, Inc. Moock has developed interactive applications for Sony, HP, Procter & Gamble and other brands.

== Multiuser era ==
Moock is also an advocate of the multiuser technology applications (what he called 'the Multiuser Era'). He is one of the creators of the Union project — a development platform for such applications.

== Bibliography ==
Moock has written several books about Flash and ActionScript, some of the ones became the bestsellers. His works are translated into many languages (inсluding French, German, Russian).

- 2001. ActionScript: The Definitive Guide. O'Reilly.
- 2002. ActionScript for Flash MX: The Definitive Guide. O'Reilly.
- 2003. ActionScript for Flash MX Pocket Reference. O'Reilly.
- 2004. Essential ActionScript 2.0. O'Reilly.
- 2007. Essential ActionScript 3.0. O'Reilly.
