= Adobe Muse =

Offline website builder developed by Adobe Systems

- Developer: Adobe Systems
- Release: May 7, 2012
- Stable release: CC 2018 (2018.1.0.266) / April 4, 2018; 8 years ago
- Written in: Flash, Flex, AIR
- Operating system: OS X and Windows
- Available in: 19 languages
- List of languages American English, British English, Brazilian Portuguese, Czech, Danish, Dutch, Finnish, French, German, Italian, Japanese, Korean, Norwegian, Polish, Russian, Spanish, Swedish, Traditional Chinese, Turkish
- Type: Website builder
- License: Trialware software as a service
- Website: muse.adobe.com

Adobe Muse is a discontinued no code offline website builder used to create fixed, fluid, or adaptive websites, without the need to write code. It generates static pages, but does not manage hosting. Users can add more advanced functionality such as blogging and E-commerce to their website with plugins created by third-party developers. This application is available to download through Adobe's Creative Cloud subscription. The final feature improvement release was made available on March 26, 2018. Technical support for Muse ended on March 26, 2020.

== Overview ==
=== Themes ===
Adobe Muse themes are created inside Adobe Muse and shared as a .muse file. Themes do not require any configuration or setup to get running. Since Adobe Muse generates static HTML files, the files can be exported to the browser for testing without needing to be hosted. However, because of its static nature, themes cannot be applied to existing content and content cannot be imported into a theme. Since themes are created inside Adobe Muse, they do not require knowledge of any code. Free starter designs are offered on Adobe Muse. Themes can be viewed via a built in 'Preview' option that allows users to preview their website in the application. Users can also temporarily host their website in Business Catalyst for free as part of the Creative Cloud subscription.

=== Widgets ===
Adobe Muse widgets are written in an XML format called MuCow (Muse Configurable Options Widget). Widgets are placed onto a Muse canvas and their content is embedded directly into the HTML of the site. Widgets have allowed Muse users to add blogs, eCommerce, animations, etc. to a Muse website.

== History ==
When Muse was initially created in May 2012, it was made to generate websites for 3 types of devices (Desktop, Tablet, and Mobile). Using viewports and redirects, a Muse website users would access a site that was built specifically for their generic device type. In May 2012, fluid design was just beginning to be used mainstream. After years of requests, Muse became capable of building fully responsive content with its 2015.1 release.

=== Release history ===
Version	Released	Improvements included
1	May 7, 2012	Initial release
2	August 20, 2012	Built-in contact forms, auto generated sitemaps, auto generated navigation, faster loading times, and ability to attach files
3	December 11, 2012	Enhanced code quality, html5 animations, and mobile layout options
4	February 26, 2013	Spelling checker, export options, and code quality
5	June 17, 2013	In-browser editing, scroll effects, and layers panel
6	August 13, 2013	Parallax scrolling
7	November 13, 2013	Ability for developers to create 3rd-party widgets, social media widgets, and full-screen slideshows. MuseWidgets.com was created as the official source for Adobe Muse widgets.
2014	June 18, 2014	A complete software rebuild with 64-bit support, in-app preview, and HiDPI support
2014.1	August 13, 2014	Self-hosted web fonts, bullet and numbered lists, and reCaptcha integration
2014.2	October 6, 2014	SVG import, text synchronizing across desktop and mobile, secure FTP support, and find and replace
2014.3	February 11, 2015	Usability and performance improvements, show and hide frame edges, secure FTP auto-detection, and HiDPI support for Windows
2015	June 15, 2015	Adobe Stock integration, Typekit integration, and contact form updates
2015.1	February 8, 2016	Free-form responsive web design, customizable starter designs, and integrated with Adobe Stock
2015.2	June 20, 2016	Better collaboration with libraries, asset collector, and improved Illustrator workflows
2017	November 4, 2016	Support for animations through CC Libraries, power zoom functionality, and support for Google reCAPTCHA version 2
2018	March 26, 2018	Final release

== See also ==
- Adobe Dreamweaver
- CSS framework
