= BrowserQuest =

- Developers: Little Workshop, Mozilla Foundation
- Publisher: Mozilla Foundation
- Genre: Massively multiplayer online role-playing game
- Mode: Multiplayer

BrowserQuest was a free massively multiplayer online role-playing game created by French developer Little Workshop and the Mozilla Foundation.

== Technology ==
BrowserQuest was a demonstration of a number of modern web technologies. It was written for the web platform, utilizing WebSockets for multiplayer networking, and was playable from modern web browsers. The client makes use of canvas elements to render the graphics, web workers to initialize the map without affecting the rest of the page, localStorage to save progress, media queries to dynamically resize the game to the device, and HTML audio to render the sound. The server was written in JavaScript, and runs in Node.js. The server and browser communicate using WebSockets.

Both BrowserQuest's client and server source code are available on GitHub. Its code was licensed under MPL 2.0. Content was licensed under CC BY-SA 3.0.

== Gameplay ==
In BrowserQuest, players could interact with each other using the in-game chat system, or by working together to defeat enemies. There are achievements available to unlock as one plays. Loot was dropped when players defeat the enemies, which can be picked up by any player. Loot includes the invincibility potion, which changes a player's outfit to appear like the Firefox logo, and various gear. At one point in time, the system recorded over 1,900 users playing at the same time.
