= Flashpoint Archive =

Web applications archival project

- Other names: BlueMaxima's Flashpoint
- Original author: Ben "BlueMaxima" Latimore
- Developer: Community contributors
- Release: Zero / December 26, 2017; 8 years ago
- Stable release: 14.0.3 (Kingfisher) / November 21, 2025; 9 months ago
- Written in: TypeScript, PHP, C++, C#, C, Rust
- Operating system: Microsoft Windows, macOS, Linux
- License: MIT (launcher), proprietary (engines, games)
- Website: https://flashpointarchive.org/
- Repository: github.com/FlashpointProject/launcher/

Flashpoint Archive (formerly BlueMaxima's Flashpoint) is an archival and preservation project that allows browser games, web animations and other general rich web applications to be played in a secure format, after all major browsers removed native support for NPAPI/PPAPI plugins in the mid-to-late 2010s as well as the plugins' deprecation. The project contains over 200,000 applications from over 120 browser plugins, most notably Adobe Flash, which can be installed and played using the provided Flashpoint Launcher and its associated tools.

== History ==
The project was started by Australian Ben "BlueMaxima" Latimore in late 2017, initially as part of a separate project from the Archive Team. The project has since developed a launcher for playing the archived games and animations, and has reached a total size of 1.68 TB. The project allows games to be played through a proxy that receives and blocks any web requests and calls needed, bypassing any DRM that relied on the web. BlueMaxima stepped down as leader of the project in early 2023 in order to move on to other projects, including finishing a book dedicated towards the early history of web games named after Flashpoint.

== Supported plugins ==
While named after and mostly focused on Flash content, media using other discontinued web plugins are also preserved, including Shockwave, Microsoft Silverlight, Java applets, and the Unity Web Player, as well as software frameworks such as ActiveX. Other currently used web technologies are also preserved in Flashpoint, like HTML5. As of Flashpoint 14, 126 web technologies are listed as being preserved.

== Legality ==
The legality of the project has been described as "unclear" but creators who do not want their games included can ask for their removal. Nitrome removed their games from the archive in 2020, as they were planning to remake their games under HTML5.

== Editions ==
There are two editions of Flashpoint that are currently released, Infinity and Ultimate. The Infinity edition is an official launcher that downloads and manages games for the user, which provides an alternative to downloading the entire archive. The Ultimate edition contains every archived game and animation preinstalled and is designed to be used by archivists. Older versions of the launcher also included a Core edition, which was a version with limited content included, designed to be used by curators for adding games to the archive. This has since been merged into Infinity as a separate mode starting with Flashpoint 12.

== Reception ==
Flashpoint has received acclaim for its dedication towards both its preservation project and the launcher it provides for easy access. Flashpoint has also led to the creation of a similar project, Kahvibreak, which is dedicated towards the preservation of Java mobile games used on feature phones during the 2000s.

== See also ==
- Ruffle, an emulator that can run Flash content through WebAssembly
