= Swfdec =

Computer software

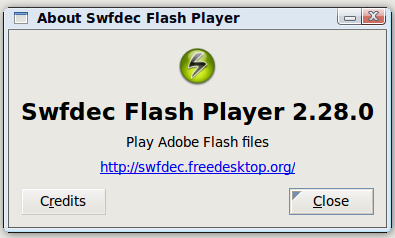
Screenshot of the SwfDec version shipped with GNOME 2.28.0

Swfdec is an outdated free and open-source replacement for Adobe Flash Player. It runs on Linux and FreeBSD and is distributed under the terms of the GNU Lesser General Public License (LGPL). Its last release was 0.8.4, on December 21, 2008; 17 years ago and latest in stable 0.9.2 of 2008-11-11.

Development of Swfdec has stopped. As of March 2016, the most recent commit to its Git repository was in December 2009.

== Technical ==
Swfdec is a library that can be used to play Flash files. There is a standalone player and a Mozilla plugin that uses the library. Swfdec supports Flash through version 4, and most features of Flash through version 9. The player was routinely updated to support the latest features demanded by video players, resulting in most (including YouTube, Google Video, Lulu.tv, AOL video, and CNN video) working at any given time.

== Linux support ==
Swfdec was chosen in 2007 as the Flash player for Fedora, and it has been ported to DirectFB for embedded use alongside its X11 and GTK+ bindings. It uses the Cairo graphics library for rendering, GStreamer for decoding audio and video, and PulseAudio, OSS, or ALSA for audio playback.
