= Shumway (software) =

Adobe Flash compatibility layer

- Shumway displaying its test animation
- Developer: Mozilla Research
- Written in: JavaScript
- License: Apache and OFL
- Website: mozilla.github.io/shumway
- Repository: github.com/mozilla/shumway

Shumway is a discontinued compatibility layer for playing Adobe Flash (SWF) files developed by Mozilla from 2012 to 2016.

== History ==
Shumway is a discontinued media player for playing Adobe Flash (SWF) files. It was intended as an open-source replacement for Adobe Flash Player. It is licensed under Apache and SIL Open Font License (OFL). Mozilla started development on it in 2012. It was preceded by a failed earlier project called Gordon, a JavaScript library with a similar concept and name, which interprets SWF files with onboard resources of a browser via SVG conversion. These names are an allusion to Flash Gordon and Gordon Shumway.

Shumway renders Flash contents by translating Flash file contents to HTML5 elements, and running an ActionScript interpreter in JavaScript. It supports both AVM1 and AVM2, and ActionScript versions 1, 2, and 3.

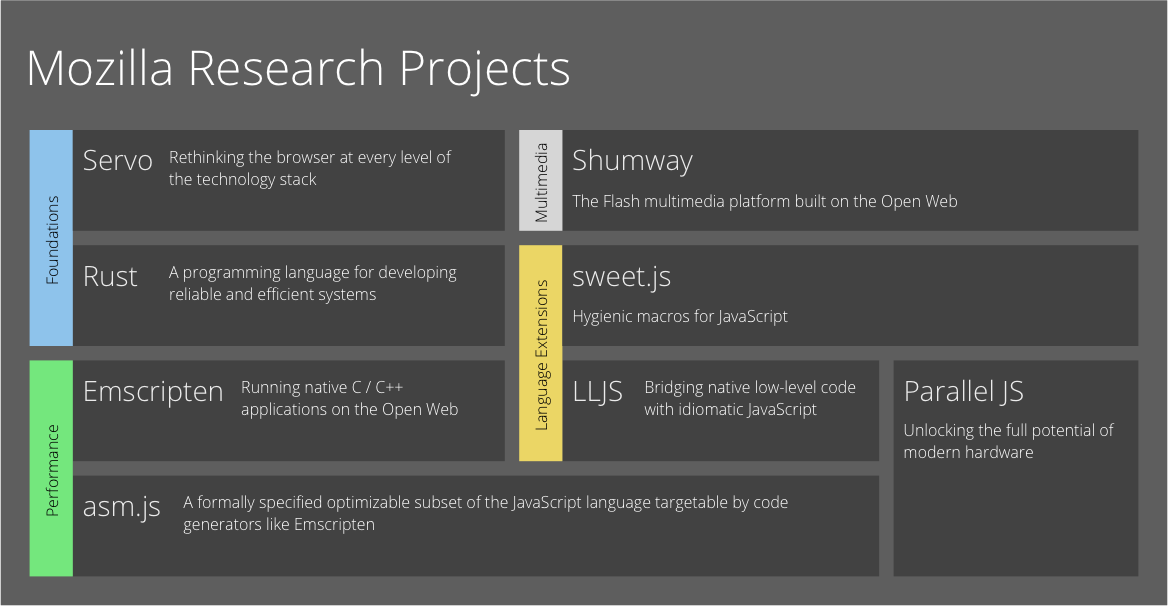
Mozilla Research's projects diagram featuring Shumway

Development of Shumway has effectively ceased. Although the project remains available on GitHub (see External links), in February 2016, the project was moved to the "Firefox Graveyard" and is thus considered defunct from Mozilla's point of view. Mozilla's strategy in 2016 was to continue to support Adobe Flash, as an exception to its general policy of ceasing support for NPAPI plugins by the end of 2016.

== See also ==
- Ruffle
- Google Swiffy
- Adobe Wallaby
