= Adobe Edge Animate =

Software tool

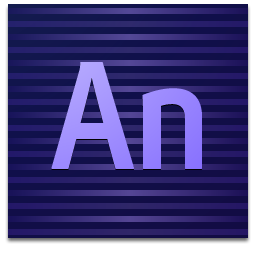
- Developer: Adobe
- Final release: 2.0.3 / 18 June 2014; 11 years ago
- Written in: C++
- Operating system: Microsoft Windows and limited compatibility on Mac OS X
- Website: www.adobe.com/products/edge-animate.html

Adobe Edge Animate, formerly known as just Adobe Edge, is a web development tool developed by Adobe Systems that uses HTML5, JavaScript, and CSS3 functionality. It later became part of the Adobe Edge suite, and was available as a free 30-day trial download from Adobe Creative Cloud. As of November 2015, Edge Animate is no longer being actively developed.

== Description ==
On August 1, 2011, Adobe announced the development of Edge as a new multimedia authoring tool to succeed the Flash platform for browser-delivered content, and released a preview version of the software, which was downloaded 50,000 times within 24 hours.

Edge builds applications based on a foundation of HTML5, JavaScript, jQuery and CSS3. These applications are compatible with HTML5-compatible browsers.

On November 9, 2011, Adobe announced that it would no longer develop Flash for mobile browsers and was planning on developing new products with more open technologies and standards like HTML5, JavaScript, and CSS3. Flash and Adobe AIR would continue to support development of native apps (which do not run in a browser) on mobile platforms.

In November 2015, Adobe announced that Edge Animate and the rest of the Edge suite was no longer being actively developed. Instead, their core capabilities would be brought to other apps in their catalog like Adobe Animate, Adobe Dreamweaver, Adobe XD and Adobe Photoshop.

== See also ==
- Adobe Animate
- Adobe Edge
- Adobe Dreamweaver
- Adobe XD
- Adobe Photoshop
- Adobe Muse
