= CrossBridge =

- Other names: Project Alchemy
- Developer: Adobe Systems
- Release: 2008; 18 years ago
- License: Open-source
- Website: adobe-flash.github.io/crossbridge/
- Repository: github.com/adobe-flash/crossbridge

CrossBridge is an open-source toolset developed by Adobe Systems, that cross-compiles C and C++ code to run in Adobe Flash Player or Adobe AIR. Projects compiled with CrossBridge run up to 10 times faster than ActionScript 3 projects. CrossBridge was also known as "Alchemy" and the "Flash Runtime C++ Compiler", or "FlasCC".

CrossBridge uses high-performance memory-access opcodes in the Flash Player (known as "Domain Memory") to work with in-memory data quickly. CrossBridge uses the LLVM and GCC as compiler backends, in order to compile C++ code, optimize it, and transform it to run within AVM2 (ActionScript Virtual Machine 2). Programs built with CrossBridge are up to 10 times faster than normal ActionScript code, but up to 2× to 10× slower than native C++ code.

CrossBridge can generate Flash Player movies (.swf files), or Flash Libraries (.swc files), which can then be used by larger projects written in ActionScript 3 and compiled using the free Apache Flex SDK (formerly the Adobe Flex SDK). CrossBridge also uses the GPU-based 3D rendering acceleration present in Flash Player 11 (known as Stage3D).

Using CrossBridge, Adobe ported OpenGL for use within Flash Player Stage3D and released it as an open-source project in 2012. The Lua programming language (version 5.1) was also ported to run in Flash Player using CrossBridge, and released on Google Code. CrossBridge-compiled projects also enabled running client-side digital signal processing in real-time, including fast Fourier transform and Mexican hat wavelet transform.

== History ==
In 2008, CrossBridge was released by Adobe as "Project Alchemy", on the Adobe Labs website. It enabled compilation of specially modified C++ projects to SWF, using the LLVM and GCC compilers.

In 2012, in an attempt to monetize Flash Player, Adobe restricted use of the Stage3D and Domain Memory features of Flash Player under the "Premium Features" brand. The "Premium Features" were licensed for use and publishers were to pay royalties to Adobe for use of the same. Project Alchemy was commercially released as the Flash Runtime C++ Compiler.

In 2013, Adobe open-sourced the Flash Runtime C++ Compiler as CrossBridge, and released it on the GitHub code hosting website. The "Premium Features" were also made free for use, and no longer required licensing or royalties.

== See also ==
- asm.js
- Emscripten
- Google Native Client (NaCl)
- WebAssembly – an in-development bytecode for browsers
