= Protected Streaming =

Protected Streaming is a DRM technology by Adobe. The aim of the technology is to protect digital content (video or audio) from unauthorized use.

Protected Streaming consists of many different techniques; basically there are two main components: encryption and SWF verification.

This technique is used by the Hulu desktop player and the RTÉ Player. Fifa.com also uses this technique to serve the videos on the official site. Some videos on YouTube also use RTMPE, including those uploaded there by BBC Worldwide.

== Encryption ==
Streamed content is encrypted by the Flash Media Server "on the fly", so that the source file itself does not need to be encrypted (a significant difference from Microsoft's DRM). For transmission ("streaming"), a special protocol is required, either RTMPE or RTMPS.

RTMPS uses SSL-encryption. In contrast, RTMPE is designed to be simpler than RTMPS, by removing the need to acquire a SSL Certificate. RTMPE makes use of well-known industry standard cryptographic primitives, consisting of Diffie–Hellman key exchange and HMACSHA256, generating a pair of RC4 keys, one of which is then used to encrypt the media data sent by the server (the audio or video stream), while the other key is used to encrypt any data sent to the server. RTMPE caused less CPU-load than RTMPS on the Flash Media Server.

Tools which have a copy of the well-known constants extracted from the Adobe Flash Player are able to capture RTMPE streams, a form of the trusted client problem. Adobe issued DMCA takedowns on RTMPE recording tools, including rtmpdump, to try to limit their distribution. In the case of rtmpdump, however, this led to a Streisand effect.

== SWF verification ==
The Adobe Flash Player uses a well-known constant, appended to information derived from the SWF file (a hash of the file and its size), as input to HMACSHA256. The HMACSHA256 key is the last 32 bytes of the server's first handshake packet. The Flash Media Server uses this to limit access to those clients which have access to the SWF file (or have been given a copy of the hash and the size of the SWF file).

All officially allowed clients (which are in fact *.swf files) need to be placed on the Flash Media Server streaming the file. Any other client requesting a connection will receive a "connection reject".

The combination of both techniques is intended to ensure streams cannot be sniffed and stored into a local file, as SWF verification is intended to prevent third party clients from accessing the content. However, it does not achieve this goal. Third party clients are free to write the decrypted content to a local file simply by knowing the hash of the SWF file and its size. In practice, therefore, Adobe's own implementation of the Macromedia Flash Player is the only client which does not allow saving to a local file.

The only possible way to restrict connections to a Flash Media Server is to use a list of known hosts, to avoid the whole player (the Flash client) being placed on an unauthorised website. Even this has no real benefit for mass-distributed files, as any one of the known hosts could take a copy of the data and re-distribute it at will. Thus "known host" security is only useful when the known hosts can be trusted not to re-distribute the data.
