= FHTML =

FHTML (Fluid Hyper Text Markup Language) or FluidHtml is an interpreted markup language that renders in Adobe Flash. Rich web applications are globally popular, but most are not easy to learn, and generate pages that are not amenable to search engine optimization; FHTML was created to deal with these issues. FHTML can be used with server-side web technologies such as Java, .NET Framework and PHP. Development of the language went through private beta testing, and was planned to be opened for beta testing sometime in 2010.

== Advantages ==
FHTML does not need to be compiled like Flex, Silverlight, and Flash.

== Criticism ==
As search engines like Google and Yahoo gradually become more proficient at indexing the content of Flash files, a critic wonders, "does FluidHTML really fix anything that isn’t already steadily improving?"

== Examples ==
Auction house Sotheby's uses FHTML for its online retail catalog.
