= SWiSH Max =

2D animation software

- The interface of SWiSH Max2
- Developer(s): SwishZone
- Final release: SWiSH Max 4.0 / June 20, 2011; 14 years ago
- Operating system: MS Windows
- Type: Macromedia Flash
- License: Proprietary EULA
- Website: Original website

SWiSH Max is a Flash, Dynamic HTML and vector graphic creation tool that is commonly used to create interactive and cross-platform movies, animations, and presentations. It was developed and distributed by Swishzone.com Pty Ltd, based in Sydney, Australia. In October 2016, Swishzone.com posted a message on their website indicating that Swishzone.com was closed and their products were removed from distribution. A software key generated was made available for download from their home page.

SWiSH Max primarily outputs to the .swf format, which is currently under control of Adobe Systems.

SWiSH Max was designed for the Windows operating system. SWiSH Max3 added features such as a knife drawing tool, advanced shape operations, and ActionScript 2.0 classes.

== Graphics ==
SWiSH Max is generally considered to be a simpler and less costly Flash creation tool in comparison with Adobe Flash. SWiSH Max does not support some Adobe Flash features such as ActionScript 3.0, shape tweens, and bitmap drawing capabilities. It does, however, include general Flash creation features such as vector drawing, motion tweens, and symbol editing. In addition, SWiSH Max incorporates a number of automated effects and transitions, which make building certain Flash elements such as buttons, advanced transition effects, and interactive Flash sites simpler. One drawback of SWiSH Max is its inability to open or save .fla files, which limits exchanges between other programs to final .swf files.

== Scripting ==
The scripting used in SWiSH Max is a variation of ActionScript, commonly known as SWiSH script. SWiSH script contains most ActionScript 2.0 functionality, including support for ActionScript 2.0 classes in SWiSH Max 3.

== See also ==
- List of 2D animation software
- Adobe Flash
