= Adobe SWC file =

ShockWave Component (SWC)
- Filename extension: .swc
- Internet media type: application/octet-stream
- Magic number: PK\003\004
- Developed by: Adobe Systems
- Type of format: Class Library
- Container for: XML SWF CSS
- Extended from: ZIP

An SWC file is a package of precompiled Flash symbols and ActionScript code that allows a Flash or Flex developer to distribute classes and assets, or to avoid recompiling symbols and code that will not change. SWC files can be generated by the Adobe Flash Professional authoring tool, and by Flash Builder (or its companion compiler MXMLC). They are sometimes referred to as class libraries and cannot be directly executed by the Flash Player.

SWC code libraries are typically included in an ActionScript 3 project, and compiled into the final SWF file alongside the developer's program, by the ActionScript 3 compiler. Only the classes that have been used by the project (and their dependencies) are transferred into the resulting SWF file.

== Format ==
A SWC file is compressed by means of the ZIP archive format. Renaming the extension of a SWC file to "zip" will allow any ZIP-compatible decompression software to show the contents of the file.

An uncompressed SWC file contains at least a catalog.xml file, and a SWF file, usually named "library.swf". It may also contain other files, such as CSS files. The catalog contains a list of the ActionScript classes contained in the library, their dependencies, and modification dates.

=== Example catalog.xml ===
This is a simple example of a catalog.xml for a SWC created in Flash CS4 which contains two sounds.

<?xml version="1.0" encoding="utf-8"?>
<swc xmlns="http://www.adobe.com/flash/swccatalog/9">
  <versions>
    <swc version="1.2" />
    <flash version="10.0" build="d566" platform="MAC" />
  </versions>
  <features>
    <feature-script-deps />
    <feature-files />
  </features>
  <libraries>
    <library path="library.swf">
      <script name="ButtonClickSound" mod="1275949831598" >
        <def id="ButtonClickSound" /> 
        <dep id="AS3" type="n" /> 
        <dep id="flash.media:Sound" type="i" /> 
      </script>
      <script name="EndGameSound" mod="1275949831598" >
        <def id="EndGameSound" /> 
        <dep id="AS3" type="n" /> 
        <dep id="flash.media:Sound" type="i" /> 
      </script>
    </library>
  </libraries>
  <files>
  </files>
</swc>
