= OBS Studio =

Screen recording and streaming app

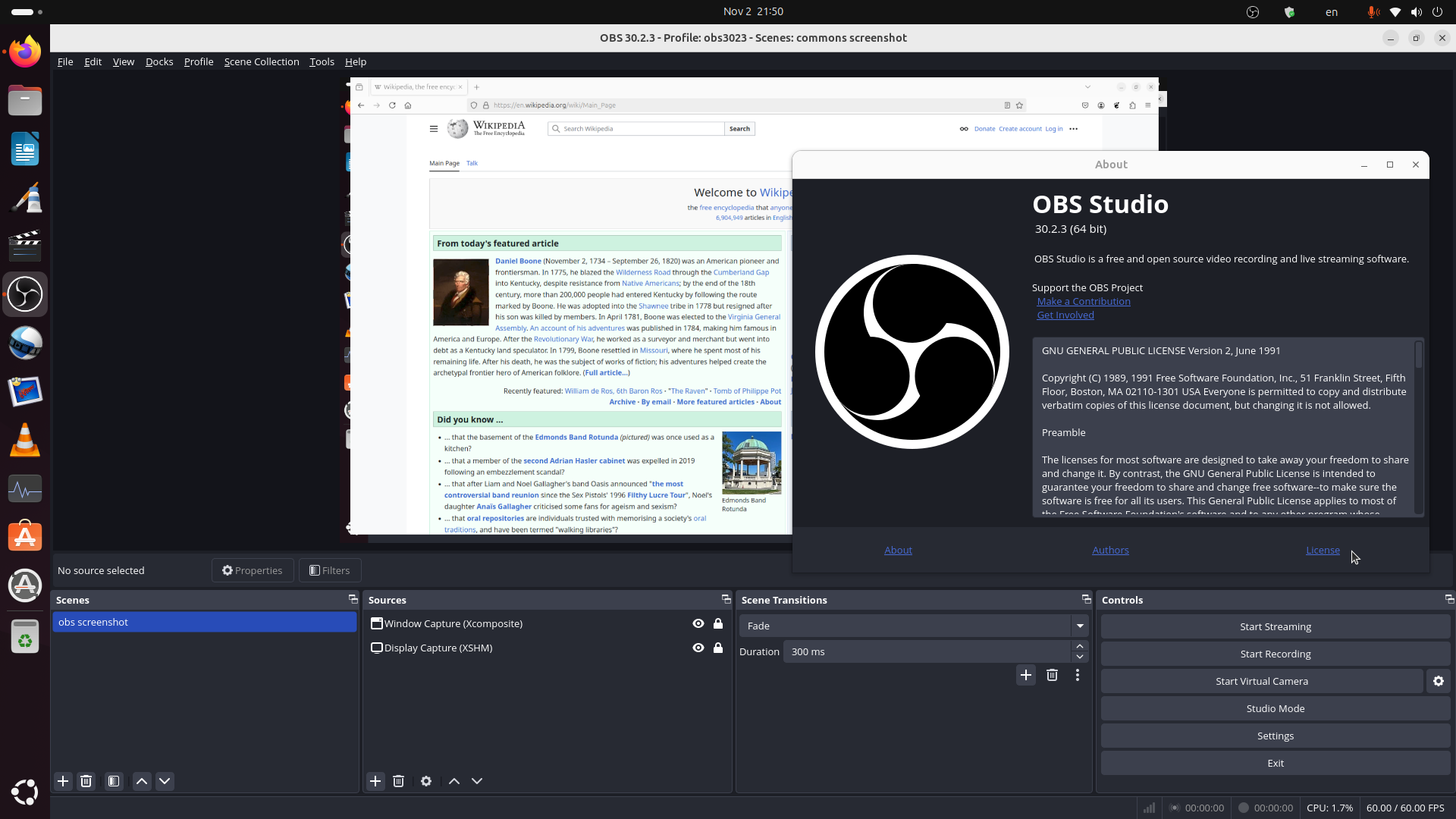
- OBS Studio running on Ubuntu
- Original author: Lain Bailey
- Release: v0.32a / 1 September 2012; 14 years ago
- Stable release: 32.2.2 / 14 August 2026
- Written in: C, C++
- Operating system: Windows 10 or later, macOS Monterey (12) or later, Linux (Ubuntu 20.04 or later), FreeBSD
- Platform: x86-64 and Apple silicon
- Available in: 59 languages
- List of languages: Afrikaans; Albanian; Arabic (Saudi Arabia); Azerbaijani; Bashkir; Basque; Bengali; Bulgarian; Catalan; Chinese (Simplified); Chinese (Traditional); Croatian; Czech; Danish; Dutch (Netherlands); English (UK); English (US); Estonian; Farsi; Filipino; Finnish; French; Gaelic (Scotland); Galician; Georgian; German; Greek; Hebrew; Hindi; Hungarian; Indonesian; Italian; Japanese; Korean; Kurdish; Lithuanian; Malay; Mongolian; Norwegian (Bokmål); Norwegian (Nynorsk); Polish; Portuguese (Brazil); Portuguese; Punjabi; Romanian; Russian; Serbian (Cyrillic); Serbian (Latin); Slovak; Slovene; Spanish; Swedish; Tagalog; Tamil; Thai; Turkish; Ukrainian; Urdu; Vietnamese
- Type: Software vision mixer, streaming media
- License: GPL-2.0-or-later
- Website: obsproject.com
- Repository: github.com/obsproject/obs-studio

OBS Studio (also Open Broadcaster Software or OBS, for short) is a free and open-source, cross-platform screencasting and live streaming software application. It is available for Windows, macOS, Linux distributions, and FreeBSD. The OBS Project raises funds on Open Collective and Patreon.

== Overview ==
OBS Studio is a free and open-source application for screencasting and live streaming. Written in C/C++ and built with Qt, OBS Studio provides real-time capture, scene composition, recording, encoding, and broadcasting via Real-Time Messaging Protocol (RTMP), HLS, SRT, RIST or WebRTC. It can stream videos to any RTMP-supporting destination, including YouTube, Twitch, Instagram and Facebook.

For video encoding, OBS Studio can use the x264, AOM-AV1, SVT-AV1, Intel Quick Sync Video, Nvidia NVENC, AMD Video Coding Engine and VAAPI to encode video streams into the H.264/MPEG-4 AVC or H.265/HEVC formats. It can encode multiple tracks of audio in AAC and Opus format. More experienced users can choose any codecs and containers available in libavcodec and libavformat, or output the stream to a custom FFmpeg URL.

OBS Studio also supports plug-ins to extend its functionality.

== User interface ==
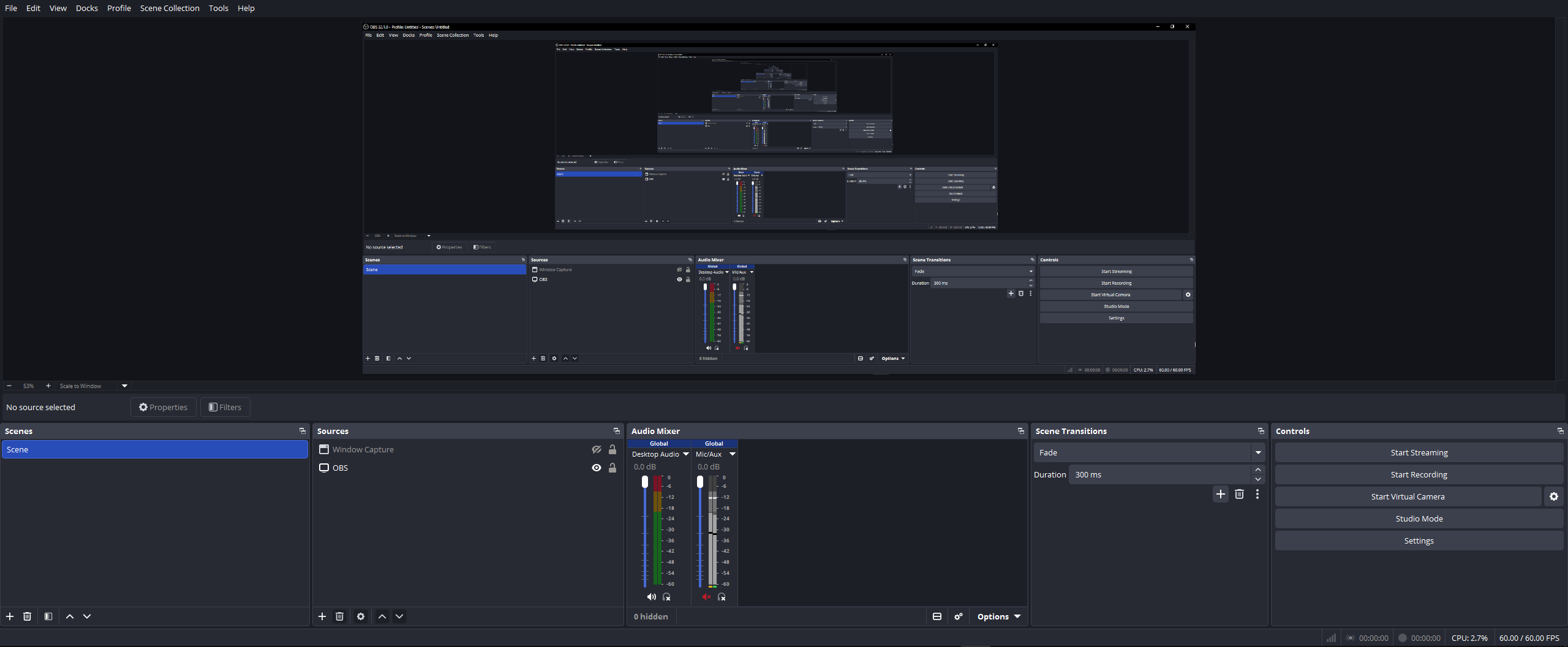
OBS 32.1.0

The main user interface is organized into five sections: scenes, sources, audio mixer, transitions, and controls. Scenes are groups of sources like live and recorded video, text and audio. The mixer panel lets the user mute the audio, and adjust the volume through virtual faders, and apply effects by pressing the cogwheel next to the mute button. The control panel has options for starting/stopping a stream or recording, a button to transform OBS to a more professional Studio Mode (see below), a button for opening the settings menu and a button to exit the program. The upper section has a live video preview, used to monitor and edit the current scene. The user interface can be switched to a variety of themes, including both dark and light themes, depending on what the user prefers. The layout of the interface can further be customized by undocking or adjusting the size and location of each panel.

When in Studio Mode, there are two canvas preview windows, the left one for modifying and preview of non-active scenes, while the right window is for preview of the live scene ("Preview" and "Program" respectively). In the middle there is a secondary transition button, allowing for transitioning to the non-active scene in the left window using user-defined "quick transitions".

== History ==
OBS Studio started out as a small project created by Lain Bailey, but quickly grew with the help of many online collaborators working both to improve OBS and to share knowledge about the program. The first version was released in August 2012. In 2013, development started on a rewritten version known as OBS Multiplatform (later renamed OBS Studio) for multi-platform support, a more thorough feature set, and a more powerful API. In 2016, OBS "Classic" lost support and OBS Studio became the primary version. In March 2022, OBS was released on Steam for both Windows and Mac.

On 16 December 2021, an OBS Studio developer drew attention to an invitation-only release of TikTok Live Studio, which appeared to be based on OBS Studio, without acknowledgement and in violation of OBS Studio's license.

== See also ==
- Comparison of screencasting software
- List of free and open-source software packages
