= H.264/MPEG-4 AVC products and implementations =

The following is a list of H.264/MPEG-4 AVC products and implementations.

== Prominent software implementations ==
- Adobe Systems supports the playback of H.264 in Adobe Flash 9.x. In latest version of Adobe Premiere Elements 7 and Premiere Pro CS4 (both shipped in 2008), both source-video and video-export (to Blu-ray Disc) support H.264.
- Apple integrated H.264 support into Mac OS X v10.4 "Tiger" and QuickTime 7. The encoder conforms to Main Profile and the decoder supports Constrained Baseline and most of Main Profile. Additionally, iChat and FaceTime use H.264, as do many other Apple applications, such as Compressor.
- BT Group offers a modular implementation of H.264. Written in C++, it has been ported to various platforms from PCs to mobile phones. All 4:2:0 profiles (Baseline/Main/High) are supported.
- Intel provides various licensing options on their implementation of an H.264 (amongst others) encoder/decoder as part of their Integrated Performance Primitives package, which includes an evaluation source code download.
- MainConcept H.264/AVC SDK offers encoding and decoding in all profiles and levels supported by the standard. MainConcept also offers a stand-alone encoding app.
- Microsoft Windows 7, with the Home Premium and higher editions
  - Includes a Media Foundation-based H.264 encoder with Baseline profile level 3 and Main profile support. Transcoding (encoding) support is not exposed through any built-in Windows application but the encoder is included as a Media Foundation Transform (MFT).
  - Includes a Media Foundation-based H.264 decoder with Baseline, Main, and High profile support, up to level 5.1
  - Includes a DirectShow filter for H.264 decoding
  - Includes an MPEG-4 file source to read MP4, M4A, M4V, MP4V, MOV and 3GP container formats and an MPEG-4 file sink to output to MP4 format.
- On2 Technologies provides software implementations of an H.264 Baseline encoder and decoder in its embedded (Hantro) product family. The codec is available optimized for ARM9, ARM11 and Cortex A8.
- Kulabyte provides live video encoding and streaming software for X86 that supports up to 1080p resolution full motion H.264/AVC video using MainConcept "High" profile. "Kulabyte Software and Hardware Encoders". Archived from the original on 2010-03-07.
- Sorenson Media offers several implementations of H.264 for Sorenson Squeeze users to choose from. These versions include Sorenson Media's legacy H.264 codec, Apple's implementation, MainConcept's H.264, and the first commercial release of x264.
- x264 is a GPL-licensed H.264 encoder that is used in the free VideoLAN and MEncoder transcoding applications and, as of December 2005, remains the only reasonably complete open source and free software implementation of the standard, with support for Main Profile and High Profile. A Video for Windows build is still available. x264 won an independent video codec comparison organized by Doom9.org in December 2005.
- The LGPL-licensed libavcodec by FFmpeg includes an H.264 decoder. It can decode Main Profile and High Profile video. It is used in many programs like in the free VLC media player and MPlayer multimedia players. FFmpeg can also optionally (set at build time) link to the x264 library to encode H.264.
- CoreAVC by CoreCodec is a highly optimized commercial H.264 decoder. According to independent tests by people on the Doom9.org forums, it is the fastest software decoder as of June 2006. The standard version supports Baseline Profile, Main Profile and High profile, except interlaced video. The professional edition supports both PAFF and MBAFF interlaced video beginning from version 1.1. The professional edition also supports speedups on SMP capable systems, and GPU acceleration using nVidia CUDA architecture.
- Nero Digital, co-developed by Nero AG and Ateme, includes an H.264 encoder and decoder (as of September 2005, corresponding to Main Profile, except interlaced video support), along with other MPEG-4 compatible technologies. It was updated in 2006 to support High Profile.
- XBMC Media Center and its derivatives, like Boxee and Plex.
- Blu-code is a professional H.264 encoder provided by Sony, aimed at Blu-ray-compliant HD production.
- OpenH264 is an open-source H.264 encoder and decoder implementation by Cisco, made available in December 2013.

== Prominent hardware implementations ==
=== Decoding ===
Several companies are mass-producing custom chips capable of decoding H.264/AVC video. Chips and cores capable of real-time decoding at HDTV picture resolutions include these:

- Broadcom BCM7411, BCM7401, BCM7400, BCM7403, BCM7405, BCM7325, BCM7335, BCM7043, BCM7412
- Horizon Semiconductors provides a family (Hz3120, Hz3220, Hz4120, Hz4220, Hz7220) of multi standard HD decoder SoC solutions for Cable, Satellite & IPTV set-top boxes, HD DVD/Blu-ray boxes and DTV.
- Conexant CX2418X
- NXP Semiconductors PNX1702, PNX1005, PNX1004, PNX8950, PNX8935 based on TriMedia Technology
- On2 Technologies provides multi-format hardware decoder IP cores that will support up to 1080p resolution full motion H.264/AVC video "Hantro Hardware Video Codec IP". Archived from the original on 2008-09-12.
- Sigma Designs SMP8654, SMP8634, EM8622L, and EM8624L
- Realtek RTD1073, RTD1283
- STMicroelectronics STB7100, STB7109, NOMADIK (STn 8800/8810/8815/8820 series)
- Texas Instruments TMS320DM365, TMS320DM642, TMS320DM643x, and TMS320DM644x DSPs based on DaVinci Technology (except for 1080i/p)
- Imagination Technologies Ltd. licensable IP cores for SoC development. VXD-370 HD Decoder H.264 with Baseline, Main and High Profile support up to Level 4.1 (50 Mbit/s). Also decodes VC-1 (WMV9), MPEG-4, MPEG-2, JPEG.
- Chips&Media has been developed multi-standard video silicon IP which covers the full line up of video standards up to Full HD(1920x1080) resolution. Allegro proved Chips&Media's Hardwired H.264 / MPEG-4 AVC Codec IP Complete (December 27, 2005)

Such chips will allow widespread deployment of low-cost devices capable of playing H.264/AVC video at standard-definition and high-definition television resolutions. Many other hardware implementations are deployed in various markets, ranging from inexpensive consumer electronics to real-time FPGA-based encoders for broadcast. A few of the more familiar hardware product offerings for H.264/AVC include these:

- ATI Technologies' graphics processing unit (GPU), beginning with the Radeon X1000 series, feature hardware acceleration of H.264 decoding starting in the Catalyst 5.13 drivers, see ATI Avivo.
- Beyonwiz have products with full advanced functions of dual HD PVR.
- Google's Android platform for mobile devices natively supports H.264 (based on PacketVideo's OpenCORE) On the T-Mobile G1 (HTC Dream), a Qualcomm MSM7200 CPU provides hardware decoding. Since about 2012, Android devices began supporting High profile.
- NVIDIA has released drivers for hardware H.264 decoding on its GeForce 8 series, its GeForce 7 series and some GeForce 6 series GPUs, see Nvidia PureVideo.
- Intel's HD Graphics and later processor graphics, feature hardware acceleration of H.264 decoding.
- Apple's 5th Generation iPod can play H.264 Baseline Profile up to Level 3 with support for bit rates up to 1.5 Mbit/s, image resolutions up to 640×480, and frame rates up to 30 frames per second. This device also plays MPEG-4 Part 2 Simple Profile video, up to 2.5 Mbit/s, 640×480 pixels, 30 frames per second. Additionally, video of up to 720×480 (NTSC DVD) encoded in the iPod compliant H.264 profile may be viewed on the device; if transferred with an iTunes alternative. Playback at full DVD resolution does not require any firmware modification to the iPod.
  - All iOS devices can play H.264 videos. Starting with iOS devices released in 2010, it added support for Main Profile, while with those released in year later, it added support for High Profile.
- The Sony PlayStation Portable features hardware decoding of H.264 video from UMD disks and Memory Stick Pro Duo flash cards. The device supports Main Profile up to Level 3 with bit rates up to 10 Mbit/s from the Memory Stick, and as of firmware version 3.30, supports video files up to a resolution of 720x480.
- The Microsoft Xbox 360 features a separate HD DVD drive that plugs into the console via USB that can play back HD DVDs, which includes HD DVDs using the H.264 codec.
- The Microsoft Xbox 360 received stand-alone H.264 decoding in the Spring Dashboard Update released on May 7, 2007. The Xbox 360 will play H.264 video files up to 10 Mbit/s peak in 1080p (H.264 Level 4.1) high profile and audio up to 2 channel AAC LC.
- The Symbian S60 OS supports H.264.
- Certain models of LG, Motorola, Nokia, Samsung and Sony Ericsson mobile phone can play back H.264.
  - LG Viewty is the one of first LG mobile phones to support H.264 Baseline Profile up to Level 3.

=== Encoding ===
- Magnum Semiconductor provides single-chip HD AVC encoder for the consumer market and multichip AVC HD encoder for the distribution and contribution markets, based on Domino Platform.
- Fujitsu has announced a 1080i encoding/decoding IC that will be introduced in March 2007, priced at 120 USD. The chip will be produced in a 90 nm process and will support High Profile Level 4 (up to 25 Mbit/s).
- Horizon Semiconductors has developed a family (Hz3120, Hz4010, Hz4120) of single-chip HD codec, decoder, and transcoder products that support H.264, VC-1, MPEG-4, and MPEG-2 in resolutions up to 1080p @ 60 frame/s. Horizon's SoC solutions integrate an audio codec, an HD display processor, CPU, 2D/3D graphics accelerator, a high-bandwidth transport processor, CA/DRM unit, video pre-processor, and a wide variety of advanced connectivity and peripherals. Horizon's ICs are designed in accordance with world-leading secure processor architectures, enabling complete content protection in compliance with numerous Conditional Access and Digital Rights Management schemes.
- The DMS-02 media processor from 3DLabs promises to encode D1 video stream (BT.601 216 Mbit/s) at 30 frame/s (equivalent to High 4:2:2 Profile, Level 3).
- Ambarella has unveiled single chip platforms that encode/decode 1080p60, 1080i60 and 720p60 video.
- Elgato Turbo.264 hardware encoder for Mac OS X connects via USB 2.0 and presents itself as three QuickTime components. Although intended for Elgato's EyeTV software, it will work with any software on Mac OS X using the QuickTime framework, such as Final Cut. The maximum resolution supported is 800x600.
- On2 Technologies provides multi-format hardware encoder IP cores that will support up to 1080p resolution full motion H.264/AVC video
- Kulabyte provides live video encoding and streaming turn-key hardware that supports up to 1080p resolution full motion H.264/AVC video using MainConcept "High" profile. "Kulabyte Software and Hardware Encoders". Archived from the original on 2010-03-07.
- Imagination Technologies provides multi-format, multi-stream IP cores that will support 1080P60 H.264 HP@L4.1 encoding, also at high frame rates to 1000 frame/s and beyond "Imagination Technologies VXE Video Encoder IP Core Family".
- Samsung Semiconductor produces C110 SoC used, among the others, on Samsung Galaxy S series of smartphones. Integrated Multi Format Codec (MFC) provides encoding and decoding of MPEG-4/H.263/H.264 up to 1080p@30fps and decoding of MPEG-2/VC1/MPEG-4 video up to 1080p@30fps.
- Alma Technologies provides ultra low latency H.264 Encoder IP cores since 2011 capable of encoding Full HD video even on low cost FPGA devices. Standalone hardware implementations without the need of CPU. "Alma Technologies H.264 Video Encoder IP Cores".
- Cradle Technologies products MDSP provides encoding of MPEG-4/H.264 up to 4D1@30fps.
- Matrox provides hardware using its MAX chip for encoding MPEG-4/H.264 up to 1080p60 HP@L4.2. The MAX chip is in a rack-mountable video interface as well as on a PCIe card for situations not requiring the video deck interface.
- VISENGI launched on mid-2014 the highest throughput H.264 hardware encoder IP core, at 5.3 pixels encoded per clock cycle, allowing 4K UltraHD at 60fps on most low-cost FPGAs, and 8K UHDTV on mid-level ones. It features two versions: a High 4:4:4 Predictive Profile capable encoder and a CAVLC 4:4:4 Intra Profile one. "VISENGI H.264 Encoder IP Core".
- Blackmagic Design launched, in 2011, a standalone H.264 hardware encoder that can encode in real time various bit rates and profiles up to 1080p60. Sources include SDI/HDSDI, YUV Component video and HDMI. It can handle up to two channels of analog or digital audio. "Blackmagic Design H.264 Pro Recorder".

=== Transcoding ===
- Some modern video chips, GPUs, and motherboards from AMD (Avivo, UVD, VCE), Intel (Quick Sync) and nVidia (NVENC) support transcoding.
- Ambarella offers a single-chip 1080p60 transcoder (A6) for broadcast head-ends and high-density transcoding applications.
- Horizon Semiconductors provides a multi-standard native 1080/60p Transcoder (Hz4010) for the triple-play/quad-play Cable, Satellite and IPTV Set-Top Box, Digital Video Recorder and Home Media Center, Blu-ray/HD DVD player and recorder, iVDRs, place shifting boxes and location-free TV.
- Magnum Semiconductor provides single-chip xcoders for the consumer market with multiple codec (e.g. AVC/VC1/MPEG2 to AVC/VC1/MPEG2), resolution and bitrate support. The company also provides professional multichip xcoders for distribution and contribution markets.
- Telestream provides software transcoding solutions including their products FlipFactory and Episode, which includes bi-directional transcoding support for H.264/AVC, to and from over 120 different video compression formats and video file formats.
- ViXS Systems has developed several transcoders capable of H.264 to MPEG-2 transcoding. These transcoders are implemented in embedded PVR TV, PC boards, Network Attached Storage (NAS), remote TV (video over the internet) and other storage devices (such as transcoding to increase storage in DVD-R and HD-DVD solutions).

== See also ==
- Advanced Video Coding
