= Haivision =

Canadian video streaming technology company

Haivision Systems Systèmes Haivision
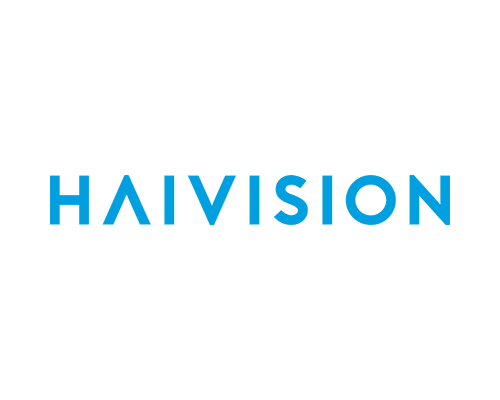
- Type: Private (2004-2020); Public (since 2020)
- Traded as: TSX: HAI
- Industry: Enterprise Video; Live Video Streaming; Media Management Platform
- Founded: 2004
- Headquarters: Montreal, Quebec; Chicago
- Area served: Worldwide
- Key people: Miroslav Wicha, President, CEO and Chairman; Peter Maag, CMO; Dan Rabinowitz, CFO
- Number of employees: 250
- Website: haivision.com

Haivision is a Canadian company focused on developing video streaming technology. Haivision is headquartered in Montreal and Chicago with about 250 employees and 7 offices around the world, including one in Rendsburg, Germany. Haivision has additionally been credited with the development and maintenance of the Secure Reliable Transport (SRT) protocol, along with the associated SRT Alliance. Notable members of the SRT Alliance include Microsoft, Alibaba, and Harmonic.

== History ==
Haivision was founded in 2004. Haivision specializes in video encoding technology to help transmit low-latency video over a given network. In 2009, Haivision acquired Video Furnace, expanding its product offerings to include campus (LAN) based IPTV and VOD services. In 2010, Haivision purchased CoolSign, which claimed to provide scalable digital signage solutions. Following the 2011 acquisition of Kulabyte Corporation, Haivision gained encoding and transcoding technologies for over-the-top media distribution. In October 2019, Haivision acquired LightFlow Media Technologies. In August 2021, Haivision completed the acquisition of CineMassive. In April 2022, Haivision completed the acquisition of Aviwest.

== Awards ==
- Emmy® Award for Technology and Engineering in 2021 for "Management of IP Multicast Video Distribution to Desktops and TVs in News & Media Production Facilities"
- Streaming Media Readers' Choice Awards 2019: Makito X4 - Best Single or Dual Stream Encoding Appliance
- Emmy® Award for Technology and Engineering in 2018: Secure Reliable Transport (SRT)
- Streaming Media European Readers' Choice Awards 2013: HyperStream Live Cloud Transcoder
- Streaming Media West Readers' Choice Awards 2012: Makito encoder and HyperStream Live streaming solution
- AV Technology 2012 End-User Awards – Furnace IP Video System 6 Finalist for Best AV over IP system
- STAR Award for Superior Technology – Haivision Kulabyte 4.0 Live Transcoder
- Most Innovative Video Extension Product - Haivision Makito Encoder
