= Ming library =

Ming
- Original author(s): Dave Haden
- Initial release: June 13, 2000; 24 years ago
- Stable release: 0.4.8 / April 7, 2017; 7 years ago
- Repository: github.com/libming/libming
- Written in: C
- License: LGPL 2.1
- Website: www.libming.org

Ming is a C library for creating Adobe Flash (.swf) files. It is often packaged as a PHP module that allows for the dynamic generation of Flash animations. In addition to PHP, the library can also be used in the programming languages C++, Perl, Python, and Ruby.

Ming's core library is distributed under the terms of the GNU Lesser General Public License, and its makeswf command-line tool is distributed under the terms of the GNU General Public License, thus making Ming free software.
