= SWFTools =

2D animation software

- Developers: Matthias Kramm and others
- Initial release: 2003; 22 years ago
- Stable release: 0.9.2 Stable / April 8, 2012; 13 years ago
- Repository: github.com/matthiaskramm/swftools
- Written in: C
- Operating system: Cross-platform
- Type: Utility software - PDF SWF
- License: GPL-2.0-or-later
- Website: swftools.org

SWFTools is an open-source software tool suite for creating and manipulating SWF files. Distributed under the terms of the GPL-2.0-or-later, it may be compiled from C source, to run under Linux, Microsoft Windows, and Apple OS X. On Microsoft Windows systems, the pre-compiled installer also installs a GUI wrapper for the suite's PDF to SWF conversion tool, pdf2swf.

SWFTools relies upon, and links against, additional third-party libraries for some of its functionality, e.g. Xpdf, PDFlib, freetype, and libjpeg.

== Tools ==
The current stable SWFTools suite, version 0.9.2, consists of the following components:

Component	Brief Description
as3compile	A standalone ActionScript 3.0 compiler.
avi2swf	AVI animation files to SWF converter (now deprecated, use MEncoder or ffmpeg for this).
font2swf	Font file (TTF, Type1) conversion to SWF.
gif2swf	GIFs to SWF conversion. Able to handle animated gifs.
jpeg2swf	Generates a slideshow from one or more JPEG pictures. Supports motion estimation compression (h.263) for better compression of video sequences.
pdf2swf	PDF to SWF Converter. Generates one frame per page. Enables fully formatted text, ::including tables and formulas, inside a SWF. It is based on the xpdf PDF parser from ::Derek B. Noonburg.
png2swf	Like JPEG2SWF, only for PNGs.
swfbbox	Allows reading, optimizing and readjusting SWF bounding boxes.
swfc	SWF file creation from simple script files. Includes ActionScript 2.0/3.0 support.
swfcombine	Multi-function tool for SWF insertion into Wrapper SWFs, SWF concatenation, stacking, and basic parameter manipulation (e.g. size change ).
swfdump	Prints out SWF information, i.e. images/fonts/sounds, contained code disassembly, cross-reference and bounding box data.
swfextract	SWF element extraction: Movieclips, Sounds, Images, shapes, etc.
swfrender	Bitmap rendering from swf files created with pdf2swf, jpeg2swf or png2swf.
swfstrings	Scans SWFs for text data.
wav2swf	WAV audio to SWF conversion.

Extra and/or adapted commands are available in the development versions and the Git repository.

The SWFTools suite also includes a Python gFX API library, consisting of a PDF parser (based on xpdf) and a number of rendering back-ends. Using the API, one can extract text from PDF pages, create bitmaps from PDF, and convert PDF files to SWF. The latter functionality is similar to that offered by the standalone pdf2swf utility detailed above, but more powerful: the API can create individual SWF files from single PDF pages, or composite pages from different PDF files.
