= Kulabyte =

Kulabyte Corporation
- Type: Acquired by Haivision, July 2011
- Industry: Video encoding technology
- Founded: San Marcos, Texas, USA (2004)
- Headquarters: San Marcos, Texas
- Website: www.haivision.com

Kulabyte was a private company headquartered in San Marcos, Texas that developed live video encoding and video stream software and provided streaming event services. KulaByte was acquired by Haivision in 2011 and is now part of Haivision's product line. Kulabyte's claimed advantage in video encoding is that it provides higher quality live HD H.264 video than any other encoder on the market while requiring lower delivery bandwidth.

== History ==
Kulabyte was founded by Chris Gottschalk and Blake Wenzel in November 2004. In 2005, Kulabyte first unveiled its video encoding technology at the IBC show in Amsterdam In 2006, Kulabyte announced a partnership with MainConcept to use the MainConcept video encoding codec. Kulabyte announced a partnership with On2 Technologies in 2007 to use KulaByte's TimeSlice technology with On2's VP6 for Flash video based personal and professional grade desktop encoding and publishing solutions. At the same time Kulabyte also announced support for H.264 in Adobe Flash Player using MainConcept's H.264 codec.

By 2008, Kulabyte delivered its first major live streaming event using its video encoding technology. The event was a live concert webcast from Kuwait called "Operation MySpace" and was done in partnership with MySpace.com using Adobe Flash Media Server through Akamai's content delivery network.

Kulabyte released its XStream Live version 2 Flash encoding software and iStream Live version 2 HTTP Streaming software for iPhone in 2009.

Haivision, a Montreal-based encoding technology company, acquired KulaByte in July, 2011.
