= SWF =

Adobe flash file format

Small Web Format (.SWF)
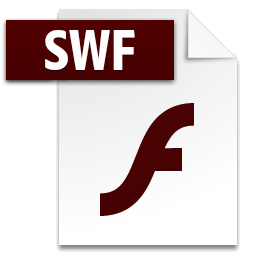
- Filename extension: .swf
- Internet media type: application/vnd.adobe.flash.movie, application/x-shockwave-flash
- Magic number: CWS,FWS or ZWS
- Developed by: FutureWave Software, later taken over by Macromedia and Adobe Systems
- Type of format: Vector graphics animation
- Container for: Adobe Flash (formerly Macromedia Flash and FutureSplash), sometimes labeled Shockwave Flash Object.

SWF (/ˈswɪf/) is a defunct Adobe Flash file format that is used for multimedia, vector graphics and ActionScript.

Originating with FutureWave Software, then transferred to Macromedia, and then coming under the control of Adobe, SWF files can contain animations or applets of varying degrees of interactivity and function. They may also occur in programs, commonly browser games, using ActionScript.

Programmers can generate SWF files from within several Adobe products, including Flash, Flash Builder (an IDE), Adobe Animate (a rename of Adobe Flash since 2016), and After Effects, as well as through MXMLC, a command-line application compiler which forms part of the freely-available Flex SDK. Although Adobe Illustrator can generate SWF format files through its "export" function, it cannot open or edit them. Other than using Adobe products, one can build SWFs with open-source Motion-Twin ActionScript 2 Compiler (MTASC), the open-source Ming library and the free-software suite SWFTools. Various other third-party programs can also produce files in this format, such as Multimedia Fusion 2, Captivate and SWiSH Max.

The term "SWF" originated as an abbreviation for ShockWave Flash. This usage was changed to the backronym Small Web Format to eliminate confusion with a different technology, Shockwave, from which SWF derived. There is no official resolution to the initialism "SWF" by Adobe.

Adobe declared its Flash player EOL on December 31, 2020. On January 12, 2021, it pushed an update to its Flash player that blocked all Flash content from running.

== History ==
The small company FutureWave Software originally defined the file format with one primary objective: to create small files for displaying entertaining animations. The idea involved a format which player software could run on any system and which would work with slower network connections. FutureWave released FutureSplash Animator in May 1996. In December 1996 Macromedia acquired FutureWave and FutureSplash Animator became Macromedia Flash 1.0.

The original naming of SWF came out of Macromedia's desire to capitalize on the well-known Macromedia Shockwave brand; Macromedia Director produced Shockwave files for the end user, so the files created by their newer Flash product tried to capitalize on the already established brand. As Flash became more popular than Shockwave itself, this branding decision became more of a liability, so the format started to be referred to as simply SWF.

Adobe acquired Macromedia in 2005.

On May 1, 2008, Adobe dropped its licensing restrictions on the SWF format specifications, as part of the Open Screen Project. However, Rob Savoye, a member of the Gnash development team, has pointed to some parts of the Flash format which remain closed. On July 1, 2008, Adobe released code to Google and Yahoo, which allowed their search engines to crawl and index SWF files.

=== SWF versions ===
The SWF format has undergone a series of version changes corresponding to versions of the Flash Player. Up to Flash Player 10.0, the SWF version and Flash Player version were synchronized. Beginning with Flash Player 10.1, the Flash Player version and SWF version diverged.

SWF version	Flash Player version	Release date
1	1	1996
2	2	1997
3	3	1998
4	4	1999
5	5	2000
6	6	2002
7	7	2003
8	8	2005
9	9	2006
10	10.0	2008
10	10.1	2010
11	10.2	2011-02-08
12	10.3	2011-05-12
13	11.0	2011-10-04
14	11.1	2011-11-07
15	11.2	2012-03-28
16	11.3	2012-06-08
17	11.4	2012-08-21
18	11.5	2012-11-06
19	11.6	2013-02-12
20	11.7	2013-04-09
21	11.8	2013-07-09
22	11.9	2013-10-08
23	12	2014-01-14
24	13	2014-04-08
25	14	2014-06-10
26	15	2014-09-09
27	16	2014-12-09
28	17	2015-03-12
29	18	2015-06-09
30	19	2015-09-21
31	20	2015-12-08
32	21	2016-03-10
33	22	2016-06-16
34	23	2016-09-13
35	24	2017-01-24
36	25	2017-03-14
37	26	2017-06-16
38	27	2017-09-12
39	28	2018-01-09
40	29	2018-03-13
41	30	2018-06-07
42	31	2018-09-11
43	32	2018-12-05

The mapping of SWF versions to Flash Player versions is based on Adobe's historical version information as reproduced by the Ruffle project and other documentation.

== Description ==
The main graphical primitive in SWF is the path, which is a chain of segments of primitive types, ranging from lines to splines or Bézier curves. Additional primitives like rectangles, ellipses, and even text can be built from these. The graphical elements in SWF are thus fairly similar to SVG and MPEG-4 BIFS. SWF also uses display lists and allows naming and reusing previously defined components.

The binary stream format SWF uses is fairly similar to QuickTime atoms, with a tag, length and payload – an organization that makes it very easy for (older) players to skip contents they don't support.

Originally limited to presenting vector-based objects and images in a simple sequential manner, the format in its later versions allows audio (since Flash 3) and video (since Flash 6).

Adobe introduced a new, low-level 3D API in version 11 of the Flash Player. Initially codenamed Molehill, the official name given to this API was ultimately Stage3D. It was intended to be an equivalent of OpenGL or Direct3D. In Stage3D shaders are expressed in a low-level language called Adobe Graphics Assembly Language (AGAL).

== Adoption ==
Adobe makes available plugins, such as Adobe Flash Player and Adobe Integrated Runtime, to play SWF files in web browsers on many desktop operating systems, including Microsoft Windows, Mac OS X, and Linux on the x86 architecture and ARM architecture (ChromeOS only).

GNU has started developing a free software SWF player called Gnash under the GNU General Public License (GPL). Despite being a declared high-priority GNU project, funding for Gnash was fairly limited. Another player is the LGPL-licensed Swfdec. Lightspark is a continuation of Gnash supporting more recent SWF versions.

Adobe has incorporated SWF playback and authoring in other product and technologies of theirs, including in Adobe Shockwave, which renders more complex documents. SWF can also be embedded in PDF files; these are viewable with Adobe Reader 9 or later. InDesign CS6 can also produce some limited forms of SWF animations directly.

Sony PlayStation Portable consoles can play limited SWF files in Sony's web browser, beginning with firmware version 2.71. Both the Nintendo Wii and the Sony PS3 consoles can run SWF files through their web browsers.

Scaleform GFx is a commercial alternative SWF player that features full hardware acceleration using the GPU and has high conformance up to Flash 8 and AS2. Scaleform GFx is licensed as a game middleware solution and used by many PC and console 3D games for user interfaces, HUDs, mini games, and video playback.

The newer 3D features of SWF have been seen as an alternative to WebGL, with a spurt of 3D engines like Papervision3D, Away3D, Sandy 3D, and Alternativa 3D targeting 3D SWF. Although some of these projects started around 2005, until Flash Player 10 however they had no support of GPU acceleration, and even in that version of the Flash Player, shaders could be used for same materials, but vertex information still had to be processed on the CPU (using BSP trees etc.) After version 11 of the Flash Player added the new Stage3D low-level API, some but not all of these projects migrated to the new API. One that did migrate was Away3D, version 4.

Based on an independent study conducted by Millward Brown and published by Adobe, in 2010, over 99% of desktop web browsers in the "mature markets" (defined as United States, Canada, United Kingdom, France, Germany, Japan, Australia, and New Zealand) had a SWF plugin installed, with around 90% having the latest version of the Flash Player.

Due to the increasing popularity of HTML5 for games and animations, as well as the numerous security holes that had plagued Adobe's SWF player, Adobe declared its Flash player EOL on December 31, 2020. On January 12, 2021, it pushed an update to its Flash player that blocked all Flash content from running.

To avoid the loss of years of Flash videos and games, an open source emulator called Ruffle was developed, which can run as a standalone application or be embedded into a webpage to allow SWF files to run on modern browsers. Since it is an emulator written in Rust, the Flash content runs within a secure sandbox, negating most security concerns.

== Published specifications ==
Adobe makes available a partial specification of SWF, most recently updated in January 2013 to reflect changes in SWF version 19. SWF versions have been decoupled from Flash player versions after Flash 10. Afterwards the version number of the SWF progressed rapidly; SWF version 19 corresponds to the new features added in Flash Player 11.6. Flash Player 14 uses SWF version 25.

In 2008, the specifications document was criticized by Rob Savoye, the lead developer of the Gnash project, as missing "huge amounts" of information needed to completely implement SWF, omitting specifications for RTMP and Sorenson Spark. The RTMP specification was released publicly in June 2009. The Sorenson Spark codec is not Adobe's property.

== Licensing ==
Until May 1, 2008, implementing software that plays SWF was disallowed by the specification's license. On that date, as part of its Open Screen Project, Adobe dropped all such restrictions on the SWF and FLV formats.

Implementing software which creates SWF files has always been permitted, on the condition that the resulting files render "error free in the latest publicly available version of Adobe Flash Player."

== Related file formats and extensions ==
Other formats related to SWF authoring in the Adobe tool chain remain without a public specification. One example is FLA, which is the editable version of SWF used by Adobe's Flash, but not by other Adobe tools that can also output SWF, albeit with fewer features.

Extension	Explanation
.abc	Actionscript bytecode used by the Actionscript Virtual Machine AVM (Flash 8 and prior), and AVM2 (Flash 9 or later).
.amf	Action Message commands for transacting with a FMS.
.as	ActionScript source code in simple source files. FLA files can also contain Actionscript code directly, but separate external .as files often emerge for structural reasons, or to expose the code to versioning applications.
.asc	Server-Side ActionScript, which is used to develop efficient and flexible client-server Macromedia Flash Communication Server MX applications.
.aso	Cache files used during Flash development, containing compiled ActionScript byte code. An ASO file is recreated when a change in its corresponding class files is detected. Occasionally the Flash IDE does not recognize that a recompile is necessary, and these cache files must be deleted manually. They are located in %USERPROFILE%\Local Settings\Application Data\Macromedia\Flash8\en\Configuration\Classes\aso on Win32 / Flash8.
.f4a	Adobe suffix for iTunes M4A files that contain only audio streams.
.f4b	Adobe suffix for iTunes M4B audiobook files.
.f4f	MP4 atom-ized fragmented files. Containing FLV packets.
.f4m	XML manifest files. Containing base64 FLV onMetaData headers for an Adobe version of bit rate control HTTP Live Streaming.
.f4p	Adobe suffix for media encrypted with the Adobe Access digital rights management scheme which is based on the same protection scheme that their RTMP protocol uses.
.f4v	Similar to iTunes M4V files which are based on MP4 and can be played back by Flash Player 9 Update 3 and above. F4V file format is second container format for Flash video and it differs from FLV file format. It is based on the ISO base media file format.
.fla	Source material for the Flash application. Flash authoring software can edit FLA files and compile them into .swf files. The Flash source file format is currently a binary file format based on the Microsoft Compound File Format. In Flash Pro CS5, the fla file format is a zip container of an XML-based project structure.
.flp	XML files used to reference all the document files contained in a Flash Project. Flash Projects allow the user to group multiple, related files together to assist in Flash project organization, compilation and build.
.flv	Flash Video files, as created by Adobe Flash, ffmpeg, Sorenson Squeeze, or On2 Flix. The audio and video data within FLV files are encoded in the same way as they are within SWF files.
.fxg	Unified xml file format being developed by Adobe for Flex, Flash, Photoshop and other applications.
.jsfl	Adds functionality in the Flash Authoring environment; they contain JavaScript code and access the Flash JavaScript API.
.mxml	Used in conjunction with ActionScript files (and .css files), and offer a markup-language-style syntax (like HTML) for designing the GUI in Flex. Each MXML file creates a new class that extends the class of the root tag, and adds the nested tags as children (if they are descendants of UIComponent) or members of the class.
.sol	Adobe Flash Player container to hold Local Shared Objects (data stored on the system running the Flash player).
.spl	FutureSplash Animator documents.
.swc	Container for distributing components; they contain a compiled clip, the component's ActionScript class file, and other files that describe the component.
.swd	Temporary debugging files used during Flash development. Once finished developing a Flash project these files are not needed and can be removed.
.swf	Completed, compiled and published files that cannot be edited with Adobe Flash. However, several non-Adobe '.swf decompilers' exist (like that of Sothink) to convert SWF back to the FLA format, or to the more recent Apache Flex format. Attempting to import .swf files using Flash allows it to retrieve some assets from the .swf, but not all.
.swt	'Templatized' forms of .swf files, used by Macromedia Generator. It is also Adobe Dreamweaver's Flash template file extension.
.xfl	XML-based project files that are equivalent to the binary .fla format. Flash authoring software uses XFL as an exchange format in Flash CS4. It imports XFL files that are exported from InDesign and AfterEffects. In Flash Pro CS5, the xfl file is a key file which opens the "uncompressed FLA" file, which is a hierarchy of folders containing XML and binary files.

== See also ==
Adobe Flash

- ActionScript
- ActionScript code protection
- Adobe Flash Player, the runtime that executes and plays back Flash movies
- Adobe Flash Lite, a lightweight version of Flash Player for devices that lack the resources to run regular Flash movies
- Ming library
- Saffron Type System, the anti-aliased text-rendering engine used in version 8 onwards
- Local Shared Object
- SWFObject, a JavaScript library used to embed Flash content into webpages.

Other

- OpenLaszlo
- Personal video recorders – some possibly record and play swf files
- FutureSplash Animator
- SWFTools
- SWiSH Max
- Java Applet
