= Adobe Pixel Bender =

Programming language

- Adobe Pixel Bender Toolkit on Windows 7
- Developer: Adobe Systems
- Stable release: 2.5 / December 10, 2010
- Operating system: Windows, Mac OS X
- Type: Raster graphics editor
- License: Proprietary
- Website: adobe.com/devnet/pixelbender/

Adobe Pixel Bender, previously codenamed Hydra, is a programming language created by Adobe Systems for the description of image processing algorithms. The syntax is based on GLSL, and a Pixel Bender program is analogous to an OpenGL fragment shader, and is intended to be a loosely typed version of C++.

Adobe Systems' Adobe Pixel Bender Toolkit is the IDE for scripting with Pixel Bender. Pixel Bender programs are intended to be used in a number of Adobe products, and was supported by After Effects (through CS5) and Flash Player. The Pixel Bender Toolkit was bundled with Adobe's Creative Suite, and allowed programs to be created and tested. It is available as a free standalone from Adobe's website.

In addition to its primary purpose of image processing, Pixel Bender can also be used for general mathematical operations which would benefit from the hardware acceleration that it provides. An example of this is audio processing.

== See also ==
- Stage3D
