= Reliable Internet Stream Transport =

Transport protocol for reliable transmission of video over lossy networks

Reliable Internet Stream Transport (RIST) is an open-source, open-specification transport protocol designed for reliable transmission of video over lossy networks (including the Internet) with low latency and high quality. It is currently under development in the Video Services Forum's "RIST Activity Group."

RIST is intended as a more reliable successor to Secure Reliable Transport, and as an open alternative to proprietary commercial options such as ActionStreamer, Zixi, VideoFlow, QVidium, and DVEO (Dozer).

== Technology ==
Technically, RIST seeks to provide reliable, high performance media transport by using RTP / UDP at the transport layer to avoid the limitations of TCP. Reliability is achieved by using NACK-based retransmissions (ARQ). SMPTE-2022 Forward Error Correction can be combined with RIST but is known to be significantly less effective than ARQ.

RIST Simple Profile was published in October 2018 and includes the following features:

- The base stream uses RTP for compatibility with existing equipment.
- Retransmission requests use RTCP. Two types of retransmission requests are defined:
  - A Bitmask NACK, defined in RFC 4585.
  - A Range NACK, defined as an APP RTCP packet.
- Bonding of multiple links for load sharing.
- Seamless switching using SMPTE-2022-7.
- Out-of-band transmission of protection data.

The RIST AG is working on an update to RIST Simple Profile that adds link probing to allow for dynamic ARQ protection.

RIST Main Profile was published in March 2020 and adds the following features to Simple Profile:

- Tunneling based on RFC 8086, with bidirectional send/receive in the same tunnel.
- Multiplexing of multiple streams into the same tunnel.
- In-band data support in the tunnel, useful for remote management.
- Client/Server architecture.
- Firewall traversal.
- DTLS encryption.
- Pre-Shared Key encryption, with multicast support, access control, and authentication.
- Advanced authentication options using either public key certificates or TLS-SRP.
- Bandwidth optimization based on NULL packet deletion.
- Support for high bit-rate streams by extending the RTP sequence number.

The RIST AG has defined a number of Main Profile compliance levels. Approval of this document is expected soon.

RIST Advanced Profile was published in 2022 and updated in 2023.

VideoFlow has provided IPR that covers both Simple Profile and Main Profile under RAND-Z terms.

== Open source implementations and tools ==
- libRIST: an open-source RIST implementation that includes both Simple and Main Profiles.
- GStreamer plugin for RIST
- Upipe
- WireShark dissector for RIST
