= Apache Flex =

Software development kit for web applications

- Original author: Adobe Systems
- Developer: Apache Software Foundation
- Release: June 20, 2004; 22 years ago
- Stable release: 4.16.1 / November 23, 2017; 8 years ago
- Written in: ActionScript, Java
- Operating system: Windows, macOS, Linux, Android, iOS, BlackBerry Tablet OS
- Available in: Various between websites
- Type: Software development kit application
- License: 2012: Apache-2.0; 2008: MPL-1.1
- Website: flex.apache.org
- Repository: git-wip-us.apache.org/repos/asf/flex-sdk.git

Apache Flex, formerly Adobe Flex, is a software development kit (SDK) for the development and deployment of cross-platform rich web applications based on the Adobe Flash platform. Initially developed by Macromedia and then acquired by Adobe Systems, Adobe donated Flex to the Apache Software Foundation in 2011 and it was promoted to a top-level project in December 2012.

The Flex 3 SDK was released under the MPL-1.1 license in 2008. Consequently, Flex applications can be developed using standard Integrated development environments (IDEs), such as IntelliJ IDEA, Eclipse, the free and open source IDE FlashDevelop, as well as the proprietary Adobe Flash Builder.

In 2014, the Apache Software Foundation started a new project called FlexJS to cross-compile ActionScript 3 to JavaScript to enable it to run on browsers that do not support Adobe Flash Player and on devices that do not support the Adobe AIR runtime. In 2017, FlexJS was renamed to Apache Royale. The Apache Software Foundation describes the current iteration of Apache Royale as an open-source frontend technology that allows a developer to code in ActionScript 3 and MXML and target web, mobile devices and desktop devices on Apache Cordova all at once. Apache Royale is currently in beta development stage.

== Overview ==
Flex uses MXML to define UI layout and other non-visual static aspects, ActionScript to address dynamic aspects and as code-behind, and requires Adobe AIR or Flash Player at runtime to run the application.

== Versions ==
=== Macromedia Flex 1.0 and 1.5 ===
Macromedia targeted the enterprise application development market with its initial releases of Flex 1.0 and 1.5. The company offered the technology at a price around US$15,000 per CPU. Required for deployment, the Java EE application server compiled MXML and ActionScript on-the-fly into Flash applications (binary SWF files). Each server license included 5 licenses for the Flex Builder IDE.

=== Adobe Flex 2 ===
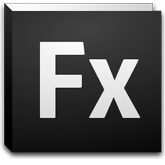
Adobe Flex (old icon)

Adobe significantly changed the licensing model for the Flex product line with the release of Flex 2. The core Flex 2 SDK, consisting of the command-line compilers and the complete class library of user interface components and utilities, was made available as a free download. Complete Flex applications can be built and deployed solely with the Flex 2 SDK, which contains no limitations or restrictions compared to the same SDK included with the Flex Builder IDE.

Adobe based the new version of Flex Builder on the open source Eclipse platform. The company released two versions of Flex Builder 2, Standard and Professional. The Professional version includes the Flex Charting Components library.

Enterprise-oriented services remain available through Flex Data Services 2. This server component provides data synchronization, data push, publish-subscribe and automated testing. Unlike Flex 1.0 and 1.5, Flex Data Services is not required for the deployment of Flex applications.

Coinciding with the release of Flex 2, Adobe introduced a new version of the ActionScript programming language, known as Actionscript 3, reflecting the latest ECMAScript specification. The use of ActionScript 3 and Flex 2 requires version 9 or later of the Flash Player runtime. Flash Player 9 incorporated a new and more robust virtual machine for running the new ActionScript 3.

Flex was the first Macromedia product to be re-branded under the Adobe name.

=== Adobe Flex 3 ===
On April 26, 2007, Adobe announced their intent to release the Flex 3 SDK (which excludes the Flex Builder IDE and the LiveCycle Data Services) under the terms of the Mozilla Public License. Adobe released the first beta of Flex 3, codenamed Moxie, in June 2007. Major enhancements include integration with the new versions of Adobe's Creative Suite products, support for AIR (Adobe's new desktop application runtime), and the addition of profiling and refactoring tools to the Flex Builder IDE.

=== Adobe Flash Builder and Flex 4 ===
Adobe released Flex 4.0 (code named Gumbo) on March 22, 2010. The Flex 4 development environment is called Adobe Flash Builder, formerly known as Adobe Flex Builder.

Some themes that have been mentioned by Adobe and have been incorporated into Flex 4 are as follows:

- Design in Mind: The framework has been designed for continuous collaboration between designers and developers.
- Accelerated Development: Be able to take application development from conception to reality quickly.
- Horizontal Platform Improvements: Compiler performance, language enhancements, BiDirectional components, enhanced text (Flex 4 includes the new Text Layout Framework).
- Full Support for Adobe Flash Player 10 and above.
- Broadening Horizons: Finding ways to make a framework lighter, supporting more deployment runtimes, runtime MXML.
- Simpler skinning than the previous versions.
- Integration with Adobe Flash Catalyst.
- Custom templates

Flash Builder is available in two versions: Standard and Premium, the premium adds the following features;

- Testing tools
- Memory and performance profilers
- An automated testing harness to connect to all the leading testing tools
- FlexUnit support
- command-line build capability

=== Adobe Flash Builder 4.5 and Flex 4.5 ===
May 3, 2011, Adobe shipped Flash Builder 4.5 copying Flex 4.5 (SDK only) which delivers full support for building Flex and ActionScript applications for Google Android, as well as support for building ActionScript applications for BlackBerry Tablet OS and Apple iOS. An update to Flash Builder 4.5 and Flex 4.5 adds support for building Flex applications for BlackBerry Tablet OS and Apple iOS.

Flex 4.5 SDK delivers many new components and capabilities, along with integrated support in Flash Builder 4.5 and Flash Catalyst CS 5.5. With the Adobe Flex 4.5 SDK which is governed by three main goals:

- Allow developers to use Flex for multiscreen application development
- Further mature the Spark (skinning) architecture and component set which was introduced in Flex 4

=== Adobe Flex 4.6.0 ===
In November 2011, Adobe released Flex SDK update 4.6, with the following changes:

- More Spark mobile components including: SplitViewNavigator, CalloutButton, Callout, SpinnerList, DateSpinner, and ToggleSwitch
- Better performance
- Updated platform support
- Enhanced Tooling – Flash Builder 4.6
- Text Enhancements

=== Apache Flex 4.8.0 - incubating ===
Jul 25, 2012, Apache Flex community releases Flex 4.8.0-incubating and it as a parity release with Adobe Flex 4.6.0. This is the first release under the incubator of the Apache Software Foundation and represents the initial donation of Adobe Flex 4.6 by Adobe System Inc.

Differences and highlights include:

- Flex trademark issues are largely cleared up
- Bug-tracking / issue-tracking system (JIRA) transferred from the Adobe bug tracker to Apache bug tracker
- Mustela test suite is donated to Apache

=== Apache Flex 4.9.0 ===
Jan 11, 2013, Apache Flex community releases Flex 4.9.0. This is the first release since Apache Flex became a top level project of the Apache Software Foundation.

Differences and highlights include:

- New locales for Apache Flex including Australian, British, Canadian, Greek, Switzerland (German) and Portuguese
- Apache Flex SDK can be compiled for any version of the Flash Player from 10.2 to 11.5
- New PostCodeFormatter and PostCodeValidator classes for international postcode formatting and validation
- New VectorList and VectorCollection classes for lists and collections of vectors
- New version of the TLF (Text Layout Framework), the TLF 3.0.33 source code is now included as it is now part of the Apache Flex donation
- Can use Java 7 to compile SDK (see README for instructions)
- Many improvements and updates to Mustella tests
- An SDK installer has also been created and is the recommended way of installing the Apache Flex SDK in an IDE
- Various important bug fixes

=== Apache Flex 4.9.1 ===
Feb 28, 2013, Apache Flex community releases Flex 4.9.1. This was a minor update to 4.9.0.

=== Apache Flex 4.10.0 ===
Aug 6, 2013, Apache Flex community releases Flex 4.10.0.

Differences and highlights include:

- Support for latest versions of Flash Player (up to 11.8) and AIR runtimes (up to 3.8)
- Improved support for older Flash Player versions (down to 10.2)
- Linux support
- 15 new Spark components
- Advanced telemetry support
- Improved international support for dates
- 480 dpi mobile skins
- Over 200 bugs fixed

=== Apache Flex 4.11.0 ===
Oct 28, 2013, Apache Flex community releases Flex 4.11.0.

Differences and highlights include:

- Support for Flash Player 11.9 and AIR runtime 3.9
- mx:AdvancedDataGrid and mx:DataGrid speed improvements
- Updated OSMF to latest version
- mobile datagrid component
- 120 and 640 dpi mobile skins
- Desktop callout component
- Over 50 bugs fixed

=== Apache Flex 4.12.0 ===
Mar 10, 2014, Apache Flex community releases Flex 4.12.0.

Differences and highlights include:

- Support for Flash Player 12.0 and 13.0 beta and AIR runtime 4.0 and 13.0 beta
- Improved mobile memory usage/performance
- Improved iPad and iOS7 support
- mx:AdvancedDataGrid and mx:DataGrid performance improvements
- New MaskedTextinput component
- JSON support for ArrayCollection and ArrayList
- Over 80 bugs fixed

=== Apache Flex 4.12.1 ===
May 3, 2014, Apache Flex community releases Flex 4.12.1

Differences and highlights include:

- Support for Flash Player 13.0 and AIR runtime 13.0
- Fixed Adobe Flash Builder bug, which inserts an incorrect attribute while creating a new project that uses Apache Flex SDK
- Extended mobile media query support
- Over 20 bugs fixed

=== Apache Flex 4.13.0 ===
Jul 28, 2014, Apache Flex community releases Flex 4.13.0.

Differences and highlights include:

- Support for Flash Player 14.0 and AIR runtime 14.0
- FDB supports debugging ActionScript Workers
- percentWidth for GridColumn
- Add Chinese translations for all the installers of Flex
- Over 30 bugs fixed

=== Apache Flex 4.14.0 ===
Jan 28, 2015, Apache Flex community releases Flex 4.14.0

Differences and highlights include:

- iOS 7+ and Android 4.x+ mobile theme support
- New Spark components skin: FlatSpark
- Spark RichTextEditor
- Native support for tables in TLF
- Promises/A+
- 54 bugs fixed

=== Apache Flex 4.15.0 ===
Jan 11, 2016, Apache Flex community release Flex 4.15.0

Differences and highlights include:

- Support for Flash Player 18, 19 and 20
- Support for AIR 18, 19, 20
- 30 reported bug fixes

=== Apache Flex 4.16.0 ===
Mar 14, 2017, Apache Flex community release Flex 4.16.0

Differences and highlights include:

- Support for Flash Player 21, 22, 23 and 24
- Support for AIR 21, 22, 23 and 24
- Support for FontAwesome 4.7
- 37 reported bug fixes

== Related tools ==
=== LiveCycle Data Services ===
LiveCycle Data Services (previously called Flex Data Services) is a server-side complement to the main Flex SDK and Flash Builder IDE and is part of a family of server-based products available from Adobe. Deployed as a Java EE application, LiveCycle Data Services adds capabilities to Flex applications.

=== BlazeDS ===
Previously available only as part of Adobe LiveCycle Data Services ES, Adobe plans to contribute the BlazeDS technologies to the community under the LGPL v3. BlazeDS gives Adobe developers free access to the remoting and messaging technologies developed by Adobe.

Concurrent with pre-release of BlazeDS, Adobe is publishing the AMF binary data protocol specification, on which the BlazeDS remoting implementation is based, and is attempting to partner with the community to make this protocol available for major server platforms.

=== Flex and ColdFusion ===
Flex 2 offers special integration with ColdFusion MX 7. The ColdFusion MX 7.0.2 release adds updated Flash Remoting to support ActionScript 3, a Flex Data Services event gateway, and the Flex Data Services assembler. Flex Builder 2 also adds extensions for ColdFusion providing a set of wizards for RAD Flex development. A subset of Flex 1.5 is also embedded into ColdFusion MX 7 middleware platform, for use in the ColdFusion Flash forms feature. It is possible to use this framework to write rich web applications, although its intended purpose is for rich forms only.

=== Application Frameworks ===
There are a number of application frameworks available which help the developer solve some common tasks and set up the application structure according to best practices.

- Tide, part of the Granite Data Services platform.
- Swiz
- Parsley
- Cairngorm
- PureMVC
- DropAS3
- Fabrication
- Mate
- RobotLegs

== Notable sites using Flex ==
- Sherwin-Williams color visualizer
- Yahoo! Messenger for the Web
- BBC iPlayer desktop downloader
- mint.com
- ChessCube
- BigBlueButton
- HBO Go
- VMware vSphere Web Client

== See also ==
- FXG
- List of rich web application frameworks
