= John Baez (game developer) =

American businessman

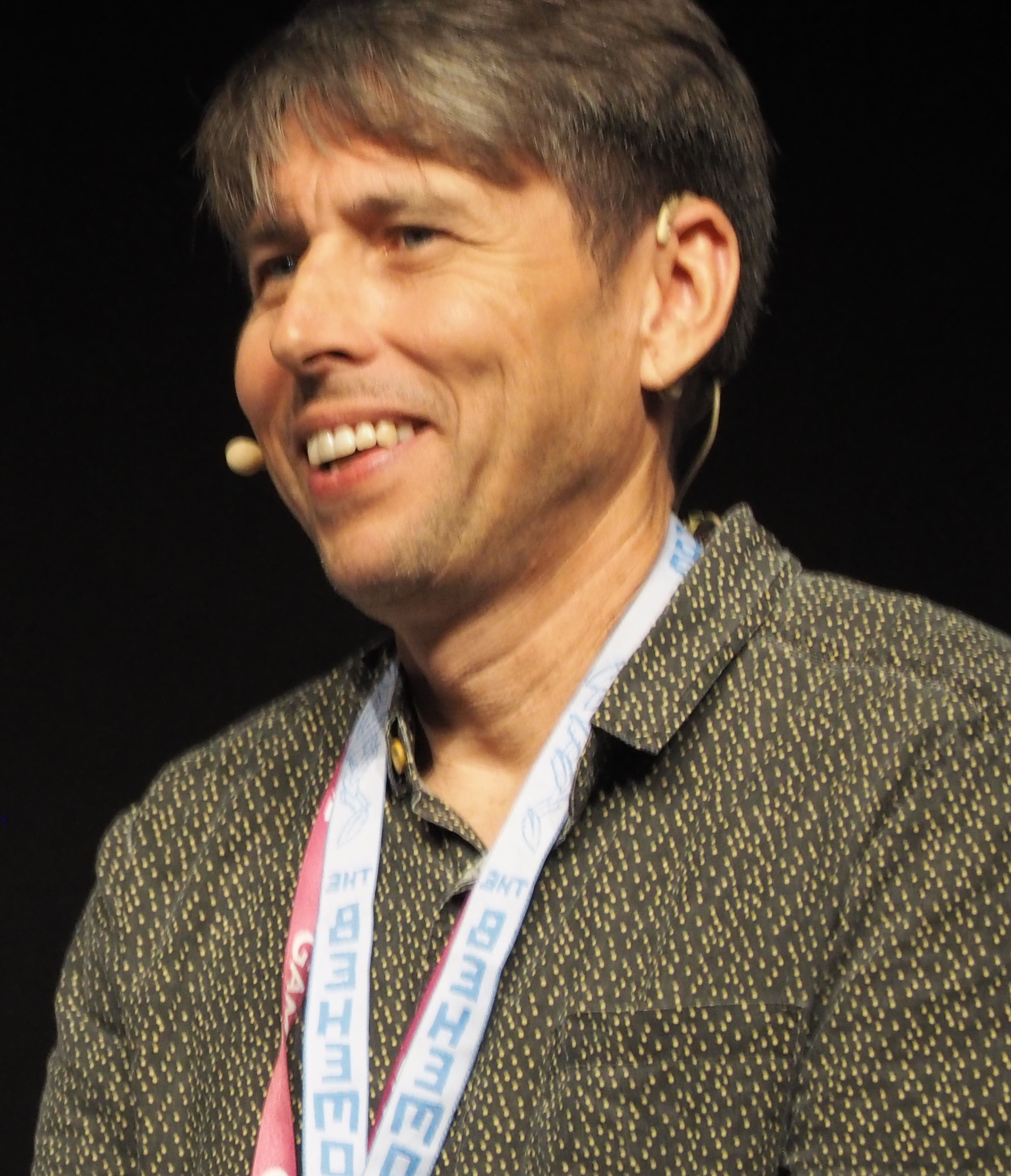
- Baez in 2018
- Occupations: Businessman, Video game developer
- Known for: Alien Hominid; Castle Crashers; BattleBlock Theater; Pit People; Alien Hominid Invasion

John Baez is an American businessman and game developer. He is the co-founder, CEO and president of developer The Behemoth. Baez was previously a 3D artist at Gratuitous Games.

== Career ==
In August 2002, Tom Fulp and Dan Paladin collaborated in creating the Flash game Alien Hominid for Fulp's website Newgrounds. Baez, a co-worker of Paladin, approached him and offered to produce the game if it were developed for consoles. Shortly after, The Behemoth was founded in 2003. Their first release on home consoles, Alien Hominid, received critical acclaim from games media, and The Behemoth quickly gained status as a prominent indie developer.

Baez, Fulp, and Paladin frequently attend trade events and conventions as The Behemoth. Baez claimed, "If you’re an independent gaming developer, going to trade shows is a lot more important than you might think".

The success of Alien Hominid allowed the team to begin development on Castle Crashers. Castle Crashers was a smash hit on Xbox Live Arcade when it launched in 2008. The game was part of the first Summer of Arcade promotion held by Xbox. It sold over 2 million copies by 2010 and began The Behemoth's relationship with Microsoft during the Xbox 360 console generation.

In 2013, Baez was interviewed about the instability of indie video game development. He claimed studios are constantly balancing the cost of development against the number of expected customers. Even with Castle Crashers' massive success, the studio's development process didn't change.

In 2024, The Behemoth celebrated its 21st anniversary. Following Castle Crashers, they released Battleblock Theater (2013), Pit People (2017), Alien Hominid Invasion (2023), and Behemoth (2024).

== Games ==
Game	Year released
Alien Hominid	2004
Castle Crashers	2008
Battleblock Theater	2013
Pit People	2017
Alien Hominid Invasion	2023
Behemoth	2024

== Personal life ==
Baez resides in San Diego, California, where The Behemoth studio is headquartered.
