= FMOD =

Proprietary sound effects engine and authoring tool

- Original author: Firelight Technologies
- Release: 6 March 1995; 31 years ago
- Platform: Microsoft Windows, macOS, iOS, Linux, Android, OpenHarmony, Wii U, 3DS, Xbox 360, Xbox One, PlayStation 3, PlayStation 4, PlayStation Vita, HTML5
- Type: Game middleware Game development tool Digital audio workstation
- License: Various proprietary licenses
- Website: www.fmod.com

FMOD is a proprietary sound effects engine and authoring tool for video games and applications developed by Firelight Technologies, a subsidiary of the Bose Corporation. It is able to play and mix sounds of diverse formats on many operating systems.

== Features ==
The FMOD sound system is supplied as a programmer's API and authoring tool, similar to a digital audio workstation.

FMOD consists of the following technologies:

- FMOD Studio - An audio creation tool for games, designed like a digital audio workstation. Succeeds FMOD Designer.
- FMOD Studio run-time API - A programmer API to interface with FMOD Studio.
- FMOD Studio low-level API - A programmer API that stands alone, with a simple interface for playing sound files, adding special effects and performing 3D sound.

Legacy products include:

- FMOD Ex - The sound playback and mixing engine.
- FMOD Designer 2010 - An audio designer tool used for authoring complex sound events and music for playback.
- FMOD Event Player - An auditioning tool in conjunction with FMOD Designer 2010.

The FMOD sound system has an advanced plugin architecture that can be used to extend the support of audio formats or to develop new output types, e.g. for streaming.

== Licensing ==
FMOD is available under multiple license schemes:

- FMOD Non-Commercial License, which allows software not intended for commercial distribution to use FMOD for free.
- FMOD Indie License, a bottom level license for software intended for commercial distribution, with development budgets less than US$600k.
- FMOD Basic License, a mid-level license for software intended for commercial distribution, with development budgets between US$600k and US$1.8m.
- FMOD Premium License, a top level license for software intended for commercial distribution, with development budgets over US$1.8m.

== Support ==
=== Platforms ===
FMOD is written in portable C++, and can thus run on many different PC, mobile and gaming console platforms including: Microsoft Windows (x86 and x86-64), macOS, iOS, Linux (x86 and x86-64), Android, BlackBerry, Wii, Wii U, 3DS, Nintendo Switch, Xbox, Xbox 360, Xbox One, PlayStation 2, PlayStation 3, PlayStation 4, PlayStation 5, PlayStation Portable, PlayStation Vita, Google Native Client and OpenHarmony-based platforms.

FMOD contains support for AMD TrueAudio, and Sound Blaster hardware acceleration.

=== File formats ===
FMOD can play back the following audio formats: AIFF, ASF, ASX, BANK (FMOD's sample and metadata format) DLS, FLAC, FSB (FMOD's sample bank format), IT, M3U, MIDI, MOD, MP2, MP3, Ogg Vorbis, PLS, S3M, VAG (PS2/PSP format), WAV, WAX (Windows Media Audio Redirector), WMA, XM, XMA (only on the Xbox 360), as well as raw audio data.

=== Game engines ===
FMOD has been used in the following video game engines:

Engine	Developer	Integrated/Extension	Ref.
CryEngine	Crytek	Integrated	
GoodEngine	Heavy Iron Studios	Integrated	
Prism3D	SCS Software	Integrated	
TOSHI	Blue Tongue Entertainment	Integrated	
Telltale Tool	Telltale Games	Integrated	
Unity	Unity Technologies	Extension	
Unreal Engine 2.5	Epic Games	Extension	
Unreal Engine 3	Epic Games	Extension	
Unreal Engine 4	Epic Games	Extension	
Unreal Engine 5	Epic Games	Extension	
Vector Engine	Vector Unit	Integrated	
GameMaker	YoYo Games	Extension	

== Games using FMOD ==
FMOD has been used in many high-profile commercial games since release; this is a partial list.

- 3D Ultra Minigolf
- Adventure Time: Explore the Dungeon Because I DON'T KNOW!
- Alien Hominid Invasion
- Allods Online
- Amanda the Adventurer
- American Truck Simulator
- Another Crab's Treasure
- AquaNox 2: Revelation
- Arcaea
- Ashes Cricket 2009
- Assetto Corsa
- Audition Online
- Australia Did It
- Automation
- Babystorm
- Back to the Future: The Game
- Barbie Horse Adventures: Mystery Ride
- Barbie Sparkling Ice Show
- Barnyard
- Batman: Arkham Asylum
- Batman: The Enemy Within - The Telltale Series
- Batman: The Telltale Series
- BattleBlock Theater
- Battlestations: Pacific
- Bastion
- BeamNG.drive
- Beach Buggy Blitz
- Beach Buggy Racing
- BEHEMOTH
- BioShock
- BioShock 2
- Bit.Trip Presents... Runner2: Future Legend of Rhythm Alien
- Bluey: The Videogame
- Boom Beach
- Boomerang Fu
- Brawl Stars
- Brütal Legend
- Bugsnax
- Carrion
- Cars 2
- Cartoon Network: Punch Time Explosion XL
- Castlevania: Lords of Shadow 2
- Cavern Commandos
- Celeste
- Celeste 64: Fragments of the Mountain
- Clash of Clans
- Clash Royale
- Clive Barker's Jericho
- Cookie Run: Kingdom
- Cortex Command
- Crossout
- Crysis
- Cult of the Lamb
- Darkest Dungeon
- Darkfall
- Dark Souls
- Daymare 1998
- de Blob
- de Blob 2
- Deadpool
- Deus Ex: Human Revolution
- Diablo 3
- Diner Dash Adventures
- Disney Infinity
- Disney Infinity 2.0
- DJ Hero
- DJMax Respect V
- Dragon Age: Origins
- Drawful 2
- Dogfighter
- Dwarf Fortress
- Dying Light
- ENA: Dream BBQ
- Euro Truck Simulator 2
- Fall Guys
- Family Guy: Back to the Multiverse
- Far Cry
- Fast & Furious Crossroads
- Fibbage
- Final Fantasy X/X-2 HD Remaster
- Fort Solis
- Forts
- Forza Motorsport 2
- Forza Motorsport 3
- Guild Wars
- Guild Wars 2
- Guitar Hero III
- Guitar Hero: Aerosmith
- Guitar Hero: World Tour
- Geometry Dash
- Hades
- Halo 3
- Halo 3: ODST
- Halo: Reach
- Hard Reset
- Hay Day
- Heavenly Sword
- Heroes of Newerth
- Hellgate: London
- Hello Kitty Island Adventure
- Hitman: Absolution
- Hydro Thunder Hurricane
- Hypercharge: Unboxed
- Impressive Title
- Into the Breach
- iRacing.com
- Jurassic Park: Operation Genesis
- Just Cause 2
- Kingdom Come: Deliverance
- Kingdom Come: Deliverance II
- KartRider: Drift
- League of Legends (replaced by Wwise after patch 4.7)
- Lego Universe
- Limbus Company
- LittleBigPlanet
- LittleBigPlanet 2
- LittleBigPlanet 3
- LittleBigPlanet PS Vita
- Madagascar Kartz
- Marvel Super Hero Squad
- Mechwarrior Online
- Metroid Prime 3: Corruption
- Minecraft: Bedrock Edition
- Minecraft: Story Mode
- mo.co
- Mortal Kombat
- Moving Out 2
- Music Construction Set: Eleven
- My Hero Academia: The Strongest Hero
- New Retro Arcade: Neon
- Natural Selection 2
- Need for Speed: Shift
- Nickelodeon Kart Racers
- Nicktoons Unite!
- Nicktoons: Attack of the Toybots
- Nicktoons: Battle for Volcano Island
- No More Room in Hell
- Noita
- Operation Flashpoint: Dragon Rising
- Orwell
- Path of Exile
- Patrick's Parabox
- Pit People
- Pizza Tower
- Planetary Annihilation
- Project Cars 3
- Project Torque
- Pure
- Puss in Boots
- Pyre
- Quake Champions
- Quiplash
- Rango
- Ratatouille
- Renegade Ops
- Reus
- Rise of Flight: The First Great Air War
- Roblox
- ROW Europe: Ruins Of War
- Ruiner
- Run8
- Sackboy's Prehistoric Moves
- SCP Unity
- SCP - Containment Breach
- Scrap Mechanic
- Second Life
- Shadowgrounds
- Shadowgrounds: Survivor
- Shantae and the Seven Sirens
- Shatter
- Shattered Horizon
- Shovel Knight
- Silent Hill: Shattered Memories
- Sky
- SOMA
- Spelunky 2
- SpongeBob's Truth or Square
- Squad Busters
- StarCraft II: Wings of Liberty
- Stargate Worlds
- Star Stable Online
- Star Trek Online
- Stranglehold
- Strong Bad's Cool Game for Attractive People
- Subnautica
- Super Motherload
- Sven Co-op
- Tearaway
- Tearaway Unfolded
- Thank Goodness You're Here
- The Forest
- theHunter: Call of The Wild
- The Jackbox Party Pack
- The Swapper
- TimeShift
- TNA iMPACT!
- Tom Clancy's Ghost Recon
- Tomb Raider: Underworld
- Tomb Raider
- Torchlight
- Torchlight III
- Tower Unite
- Toy Story 3
- Transistor
- Trine
- Tropico 3
- TUNIC
- The Walking Dead
- Unravel
- Up
- Vessel
- Viscerafest
- vSide
- WALL-E
- War Thunder
- Warcraft III
- Where's My Perry
- Where's My Water?
- Where's My Water? 2
- Wobbly Life
- World of Subways
- World of Warcraft
- Worms Battlegrounds
- Worms Clan Wars
- Worms Revolution
- Worms Ultimate Mayhem
- Worms W.M.D
- WWE All Stars
- X-Plane (simulator)
- You Don't Know Jack
- Zuma

== See also ==
- OpenAL
- irrKlang
- AMD TrueAudio
- Audiokinetic Wwise
