= Fancy Pants (video game series) =

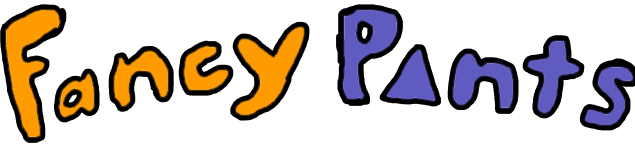
- Genre: Platform
- Developers: Brad Borne; Over the Top Games (Console)
- Publishers: 2 Left Thumbs (Classic Pack); Armor Games (Flash games); Kongregate (Note: 2 Left Thumbs now owns the rights as a publisher for Super Fancy Pants Adventure.) (Remix and Steam); EA 2D (Console); Chillingo (iOS)
- Creator: Brad Borne
- Artist: Brad Borne
- Platforms: Browser, Xbox 360, PlayStation 3, iOS, Android, Windows, macOS
- First release: Fancy Pants World 1 March 14, 2006
- Latest release: The Fancy Pants Adventures: Classic Pack; February 18, 2024

Fancy Pants is a series of free side-scrolling Flash games created by American developer Brad Borne. Four worlds have been released so far. World 1 was released on March 14, 2006 and World 2 was released on January 9, 2008. After the 2009 Comic-Con, Borne announced he would officially start working on World 3. It was released on April 5, 2012. A console version developed by Borne and Over the Top Games was released by EA 2D for PlayStation Network and Xbox Live Arcade on April 19 and April 20, 2011, respectively. An iOS version developed by Chillingo, Over the Top Games and Borne Games was released on Apple's App Store on March 4, 2012, with an Android version released on May 22, 2017. In 2017, Brad Borne made a fourth entry, Super Fancy Pants Adventure, which was later ported to Adobe Flash in 2020 as World 4.

== Gameplay ==
Fancy Pants Adventures features Fancy Pants Man as the playable character of the series. He is a two-dimensional stick figure man with spiky, choppy hair, wearing only a pair of colored triangular-shaped pants, hence his name. His gameplay is similar to the Sonic the Hedgehog franchise, in which it utilizes momentum-based platforming with running as a major gameplay mechanic.

More references to the Sonic the Hedgehog series are how some of the level design (like the "S-Tubes") is centered around momentum, increasing momentum by rolling down a slope, and how the collectibles are essential to the player's health besides providing an extra life for every hundred collected. Similar to Sonic, collectables can be lost when damage is taken, but the loss is limited to 5% of total health and collectibles.

Fancy Pants Man's home is Squiggleville, a small country town run by the Mayor (first introduced in World 2). The mayor is introduced more in World 3. Players guide Fancy Pants Man through open levels which feature obstacles to overcome and enemies to avoid or defeat. These enemies include spiders, snails, and mice armed with guns.

Enemies can be defeated by being jumped upon and crushed by Fancy Pants Man, who can also launch off them to perform an augmented leap.

World 2 introduced the snail enemy, which retracts into its shell when jumped on, after which it can be kicked to stun other enemies. Originally the snail shell was merely a novelty feature in the World 2 demo; however, during development, beta testers made a game out of getting the snail shell to hard-to-reach spots. Brad used this as inspiration to incorporate "Snail Shell Golf" which adds replayability to World 2 by allowing the player to gain access to different colored pants for the playable character. It is possible to earn a combo by keeping the snail shell in the air.

Both worlds of Fancy Pants Adventures contain different kinds of small trophies that can be collected while playing the game. At the end of each world of Fancy Pants Adventures players fight a boss.

In World 1 the boss is an angry penguin, who Fancy Pants Man accidentally falls upon and wakes from sleeping. This is the extent of the story in World 1, while World 2 has a more significant plotline. In World 2, an angry rabbit steals Fancy Pants Man's ice cream.

Players must pursue and ultimately defeat the rabbit in a confrontation at the end of the game in order to reclaim the ice cream. In World 3, his sister, Cutie Pants, is kidnapped by pirates because she defeats their captain. They then make her their new captain. The first time Fancy Pants tries to bring her back, she refuses to leave, and has assumed the role of "Princess Pirate". The second time, though, she agrees to come home, because she saw ninjas, and pirates hate ninjas.

A secret move, the wall jump, was obtainable in World 1, level 1 as a secret power-up from a pit that the player travels down through a cardboard box, and was noted by Borne that it was still a work in progress. Soon after obtaining the wall jump, the player had to employ the uses of it straight away to avoid an inevitable death from the slowly filling pit of ink. The wall jump became an official move available in World 2's increasing repertoire of moves. This was first shown in a demo that was made available by Borne on Kongregate on March 9, 2007. In World 3, he gains Borne's pencil, which he uses like a sword.

In The Fancy Pants Adventures for consoles, there are a few new additions to the gameplay. These include the ability to swim, which includes being able to kick off flat surfaces while underwater, and the ability to use a weapon later on in the game, which features a chargeable attack. The game features a main story mode, in which the player must save his sister, Cutie Pants, who has been kidnapped by a band of pirates who make her their captain. Each level contains two bonus rooms, a 'Micro-Trial', in which players must quickly chase a line of yellow squiggles, and stars, which unlock extra content, including remakes of the first two worlds. The game also features local and online multiplayer for up to four players, as well as various challenges. Playing through the game allows the player to unlock hats, pants, and weapons to customize their character's appearance.

== Development and release ==
Release timeline
2006	Fancy Pants World 1
2007
2008	Fancy Pants World 2
2009
2010
2011	The Fancy Pants Adventures
2012
2013
2014
2015
2016
2017	Super Fancy Pants Adventure
2018
2019
2020
2021
2022
2023
2024	The Fancy Pants Adventures: Classic Pack

Fancy Pants Man (left) fights against Newgrounds mascot Pico (middle) and Alien Hominid in Newgrounds Rumble.

The Fancy Pants Adventures series was created by Brad Borne, who had previously created games with the help of Mark Fleig and Jr. Fleig, who's provided all of the computer graphics on their collaborations. The previous games provided experience and allowed for more complex designs. Before using Macromedia Flash, Borne had experimented with the TI-BASIC programming language on a TI-86 graphing calculator. His first involvement with Macromedia's software was stop motion animation. The stop motion experience was built upon with Flash's action script, used to create video games, which lead to further interest and ultimately Borne felt he "knew enough to make something that [he] thought was worth playing." Despite not having a background in art, Borne created the graphics for Fancy Pants Adventures himself, resulting in the "sketchy" graphical style. The World 1 penguin boss was originally named "Pauly Penguin," and was created by one of Borne's friends, Paul Downs.

After the release of World 1, Borne began freelancing, but stated in an interview that he views his own projects as a hobby, and that he does not "get as consumed by the process as much as [he] used to". According to Borne, "Trophies were [his] way of giving a nod to a few Flash artists whose work [he] really enjoyed." In World 1, these trophies are located within standard levels, or at the end of a simple level. Several trophies from World 1 represent Borne's own works in progress. In World 2, however, the developer worked directly with the artist that each trophy represented to design a unique level for obtaining that trophy.

Borne Games is the hub for Borne's work and blog, which quickly became an integral part of the beta testing process. New betas were released on a regular basis, and players visiting the site acted as beta testers and reported software bugs. It became the central hub for the latest bug-fixes and beta news. Borne also uses his blog to post question and answer videos to reply to questions sent in by fans and has posted a "Behind the Fancy Pants" video as well as an "Official Snailshell Golf Guide". In May 2008, Borne completed a Fancy Pants Man move set and character design for the fighting game Newgrounds Rumble. In Newgrounds Rumble, Fancy Pants Man was supposedly invited for free ice cream in the Newgrounds world until he finds out that it was a setup for revenge by the other characters in the Newgrounds universe. Newgrounds did not appreciate "kiddy" games unlike killing, shooting, violent, etc. games. Fancy later fights characters like S'asshole, Hank, P-bot, Nene, and the Newgrounds mascot Pico. During the Pico and Nene stage, Pico's rival Piconjo joins Fancy's side. Fancy later tries to find whose idea was the setup.

=== World 1 ===
World 1 was the first installment in the Fancy Pants Adventure series, released March 14, 2006. It is a platforming game that is focused on speed and momentum. World 1 also introduces various trophies, side goals (squiggles and stars), and a variety of colors and styles of pants for the player to try on. The music in the game is composed by Geier Arnold, known online as API. World 1 does not seem to have a plot, other than Fancy Pants Man running around the world and accidentally waking an angry penguin from his nap.

=== World 2 ===
This is the second installment of the Fancy Pants Adventure series. It was released on January 9, 2008. This installment included new moves along with more trophies, pant colors, and bonus stages for the player to discover.

The story begins with Fancy Pants Man playing a game of Snail Shell Golf. Upon completing the mini-game, the Mayor of Squiggleville appears to reward Fancy Pants Man with an ice cream cone. Before he can enjoy his reward, an angry rabbit appears and steals the ice cream cone from Fancy Pants Man. The mayor informs Fancy Pants Man that he must retrieve the ice cream; "for the sake of humanity, justice, and so that World 2 will have a significant plot line,". He then dives into the golf hole after the rabbit. After beating all 6 Levels and 6 Extra Levels (each dedicated to a person who helped Brad Borne in the game's making), Fancy Pants Man enters The Angry Rabbit's Rabbitty Hideout (a possible reference to the Parthenon). The two soon engage in a boss fight. During the fight, the angry Rabbit will sometimes drop down spiders and one snail. The snail can be used as a method of attack to stun him. After the rabbit's defeat, Fancy Pants Man is finally able to retrieve his ice cream.

=== World 3 ===
The third installment of The Fancy Pants Adventures was released on April 5, 2012. A beta edition was available before release at bornegames.com for anyone to test out. There also is a new character in this game and new enemies. In this installment, Fancy Pants Man's little sister, Cutie Pants Girl, is kidnapped and Fancy Pants Man has to save her. World 3 introduces new elements to the series including swimming, combat through the use of a sword-like pencil, improved animations, new moves like a wall kick and new enemies. World 3 was also released for iOS devices on March 4, 2012 and for Android on May 22, 2017.

=== World 1 Remix ===
The remake of The Fancy Pants Adventures World 1, released on May 14, 2014, introduced the AS3 engine into the series. It adds a fourth level to the game, along with a new boss: The Pencil (or Brad Borne). It also added hats, from the console version, and pants patterns (also with colors). The game introduces purchasable keys, called Fancy Keys, to support the development of The Fancy Pants Adventures. A normal key will unlock all key doors in the Remix, while the Fancy Key and higher acts as a Season Pass and unlocks key doors in the Remix and any future worlds. Much like World 1, there is little plot. However, Brad Borne, in the form of a giant pencil, makes random appearances in the game. He appears in Level 3, where he destroys it after saying "Meh, no one ever liked Level 3...", and appears as the boss, using his pencil to try and defeat the player.

=== The Fancy Pants Adventures (console) ===
On November 10, 2010, series creator Brad Borne released a video on his website and on YouTube announcing a home console version of The Fancy Pants Adventures for Xbox Live Arcade and PlayStation Network. The game was a collaboration between Borne Games and development studio Over the Top Games and was published by Electronic Arts, under the company's EA2D label. New features include a two to four player mode and a brand new set of levels, as well as Worlds 1 and 2 as bonuses. The game was released on April 19, 2011, for PlayStation Network and April 20, 2011, for Xbox Live Arcade. Borne explained in an FAQ on his website that the console game is not World 3, but World 3 is something of a devolution of the console game. He also included more combat in the game, the player earns a "pencil" for which the looks can be customized. The player can charge attacks, initiate combos, and compete in multiplayer challenges; unlike the free PC version. Versions on the Wii and Steam were planned, but the team working on the game forgot about the Steam version and they canceled the Wii port very early on.

=== Super Fancy Pants Adventure ===
The fourth main installment of The Fancy Pants Adventures was announced on July 18, 2017 and was originally planned to release on Steam in August 2017; however, due to the late release in development, it was pushed back to September 2017. It was ultimately released on September 20, 2017. It features 56 levels, the most levels of any game in the series, and a new ink pen weapon that is a more advanced version of the pencil from World 3. On January 24, 2018, the game was released on iOS and Android as well. The game can be bought on the App Store for $4.99 and downloaded on the PC and Mac for $9.99. A port for Nintendo Switch was planned, but was ultimately cancelled.

=== The Fancy Pants Adventures: Classic Pack ===
In 2021, it was announced that a collection of Fancy Pants Adventures games including Worlds 1, 2, and 3 (which includes the World 1 Remaster + Remix), and Fancy Snowboarding will be released on Steam in 2024 with modern enhancements such as widescreen support and controller support, published by 2 Left Thumbs. It was ultimately released on February 18, 2024; available in Early Access.

== Reception ==
Reception

Aggregate score
Aggregator	Score
Metacritic	PS3: 71/100; X360: 67/100 iOS: 78/100

The Fancy Pants Adventures games received a positive reaction from video game critics and "drew in crowds on sites like Newgrounds and Armor Games". Both worlds have featured on numerous outlet's "Best Games" articles including ExtremeTech and GamesRadar+.

As of May 2011, World 1 has been played about 7 million times on Armor Games, almost 7.8 million times on Addicting Games, and over 2.3 million times on Kongregate. World 2 has been played over 14.8 million times on Armor Games, over 17.8 million times on Addicting Games and over 5 million times on Kongregate. World 2 also won the 2008 Newgrounds Tank Award for Best Flash Game, and is the fifth most played Flash game of 2008 in the Mochi Media Flash game advertising network. In 2009, the series was nominated at Nickelodeon's AddictingGames Showdown for "Most Courageous Stick Figure Stunt".

IGN gave The Fancy Pants Adventures a score of 7.5, praising its parkour style gameplay, but criticizing the inclusion of weapons and the lack of drop in multiplayer.
