= Dan Paladin =

American video game developer (born 1979)

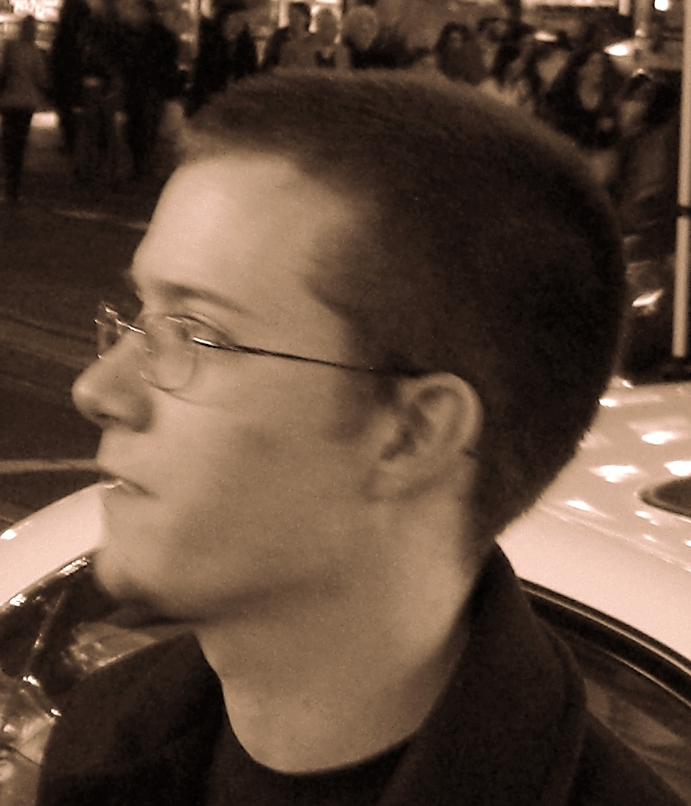
- Paladin at the 2007 Game Developers Conference
- Born: September 14, 1979 (age 46); Ohio, United States
- Other names: Synj
- Occupations: Video game art designer, developer
- Years active: 2001—present
- Employer: The Behemoth
- Known for: Alien Hominid; Castle Crashers; BattleBlock Theater; Pit People; Alien Hominid Invasion

Daniel Joseph Paladin (born September 14, 1979), also known as Synj, is an American video game artist, designer, and co-founder of the video game company The Behemoth.

He began collaborating with Newgrounds creator Tom Fulp and in the early 2000's designed several Flash-based browser games: Sack Smash 2001, Chainsaw the Children, Dad n' Me, and, most notably, Alien Hominid. In 2002, he, Fulp, John Baez, and Brandon LaCava founded the video game company The Behemoth. Paladin designed the critically acclaimed remake of Alien Hominid, as well as the hack-and-slash game Castle Crashers, with his 2D style becoming signature for these games.

Aside from working for The Behemoth, Paladin has also worked for Gratuitous Games and Presto Studios. He also composed a polka-style song that ended up being used in the closing credits for the Cyanide & Happiness animated shorts.

== Personal life ==
Paladin lives in San Diego, California, where The Behemoth is located. He was an active member of Newgrounds.

== Ludography ==
Year	Title
2004	Alien Hominid
2008	Castle Crashers
2013	BattleBlock Theater
2018	Pit People
2023	Alien Hominid Invasion
2024	BEHEMOTH

== Awards ==
Castle Crashers, a game Paladin is credited as the art director of, won two awards in Independent Games Festival 2007: "Excellence In Visual Art" and "Audience Award".
