= Brad Borne =

American video game developer

- Born: July 9, 1985 (age 40)
- Occupation: Video game developer
- Website: bornegames.com

Brad Borne is an American video game developer mainly known for his Flash game series Fancy Pants Adventures and the game Mirror's Edge 2D, an official browser game take on the console/PC game Mirror's Edge. Borne has had no formal training in game development - he majored in psychology. Borne began releasing Flash content in late 2003 with an animation called Clay Needs Tea on the at-the-time popular content website Newgrounds. He released the first part of Fancy Pants Adventures in 2006 to immediate acclaim. The game has been called "one of the most well-known Flash titles to date" in 2021. He is well-known as a champion of the Flash format.

== Ludography ==
- Fancy Pants Adventures
- Mirrors Edge 2D
