= Gretel and Hansel =

2009 video game

Gretel and Hansel is a point and click horror Flash game released in two parts in 2009 and 2010 by a Texas-based developer going by the nom de plume "makopudding". The game is based on the original tale by the Brothers Grimm and also incorporate other creatures and characters from other stories authored by them. The game has been played over 2 million times on Newgrounds alone.

A remake and Part 3 of the series is announced to be released on PC in 2025 and console in 2026.

== Reception ==
The animation was praised for its smoothness, but many players complained of lag, making the game unnecessarily difficult. The first part was listed on a "best freeware games of 2009" list in Gamasutra.
