= Creature in the Well =

2019 action-adventure video game

- Developer: Flight School Studio
- Publishers: Flight School Studio; MWM Interactive
- Designer: Bohdon Sayre
- Artist: Adam Volker
- Composer: Jim Fowler
- Engine: Unreal Engine 4
- Platforms: Windows; Nintendo Switch; Xbox One; PlayStation 4
- Release: Windows, Switch, Xbox One; September 6, 2019; PlayStation 4; March 31, 2020
- Genres: Action-adventure, dungeon crawler
- Mode: Single-player

Creature in the Well is a 2019 action-adventure game developed by Flight School Studio. It combines elements of dungeon crawlers, hack and slash games, puzzle games and pinball. The player controls BOT-C, a robot engineer attempting to restore an ancient weather machine beneath a mountain while contending with a large creature that has taken control of the facility. Rather than directly attacking enemies, the player charges and strikes energy orbs at machinery, hazards and targets positioned throughout the game's rooms.

The game was principally created by Adam Volker and Bohdon Sayre. It developed from an experimental multiplayer prototype based around striking a ball between players before being reworked as a single-player adventure. Its visual design was influenced by comic artist Mike Mignola, while its mechanics drew from games including Rocket League, Breakout and Pong. Creature in the Well was released for Windows, Nintendo Switch and Xbox One in September 2019 and for PlayStation 4 in March 2020.

The game received generally favorable reviews. Critics praised its unusual combination of genres, visual presentation and the variety produced by its tools and hand-designed rooms, while criticism focused on repetition, pacing, difficulty and its limited explanation of some mechanics. It was nominated for Excellence in Visual Art at the 2020 Independent Games Festival and received an honorable mention for Excellence in Design.

== Gameplay ==
Creature in the Well is played from a top-down perspective and takes place primarily inside a dormant machine constructed within a mountain. The player controls BOT-C, the last functioning unit of a group of robot engineers created to maintain the facility. The machine was intended to protect the nearby town of Mirage from persistent sandstorms, but was disabled by the Creature inhabiting the mountain.

The facility is divided into eight hand-designed dungeons containing interconnected rooms. Progress is based on producing energy by striking glowing balls into targets resembling pinball bumpers. Energy accumulated from these targets is used to unlock doors leading deeper into the facility.

BOT-C carries two tools. One is used to gather, hold and charge balls, while a second strikes them toward targets. Additional tools found throughout the machine alter the behavior of the balls. These include equipment that displays their projected trajectories, divides a ball into several projectiles or modifies its electrical properties. Players can change their equipment according to the requirements of individual rooms.

Challenges vary between slower puzzles based around angles and ricochets and faster encounters involving hazards such as cannons, lasers and hostile projectiles. Some rooms impose timing requirements, while others require the player to redirect balls fired by the environment. Individual rooms do not always need to be completed; accumulated power can be used to bypass difficult challenges and return to them later. Fully completing some rooms reveals secret areas or equipment.

The town of Mirage functions as a hub between excursions into the mountain. BOT-C can recover health and obtain permanent improvements there. If its health is depleted inside the facility, the Creature ejects BOT-C from the mountain and the player can return to attempt the dungeon again. The story is conveyed through brief encounters with the Creature, environmental details and conversations with inhabitants of Mirage rather than extensive dialogue or cutscenes.

== Development and release ==
Creature in the Well was principally created by Flight School Studio creative directors Adam Volker and Bohdon Sayre, who had worked together before joining the studio when it was established in 2017. Volker was responsible for much of the visual direction and story and contributed to level design, while Sayre worked on game design, programming, visual effects and other technical aspects.

The project emerged from a process in which the developers created three prototypes before choosing one to develop further. Sayre had been playing Rocket League and the mobile game Ballz and became interested in building a game around bouncing a ball using an unconventional means of control. The resulting prototype allowed a character to strike a ball using a sword. The project initially began as a multiplayer game resembling air hockey, with players returning a ball to one another, before Volker and Sayre began designing puzzle rooms around the mechanic and shifted the project to single-player. Although the finished game was commonly described as pinball-inspired, the developers did not initially design it as a pinball game. Sayre cited Rocket League, Breakout and Pong among their references and said that another developer later pointed out the prototype's resemblance to pinball. The team gradually linked its mechanics with the premise of restoring electricity to an abandoned machine: striking targets generates electrical power, allowing each challenge to contribute mechanically to BOT-C's attempt to reactivate the facility.

Much of the development involved reducing the unpredictability created by the game's physics. Sayre said the developers sought to give players sufficient control over the energy balls that rooms could be designed around timing and precise execution instead of uncontrolled collisions. The equipment system was similarly intended to allow different approaches to manipulating the balls. Volker later described the tools as an attempt to encourage players to develop individual styles of play. Volker sought a simple, high-contrast presentation that would keep the energy balls and gameplay spaces easy to read. Because lighting was not a particular strength of the small development team, Flight School removed conventional lighting and instead relied heavily on painted textures, allowing areas outside the playable spaces to disappear into darkness. The Creature was intentionally kept largely unseen so that players would form their own impression of its appearance.

The work of Hellboy creator Mike Mignola is an influence on the game's angular, comic-book-like art direction. The isolated desert town drew partly from the developers' time living in Texas, while the mysterious tone of the facility was influenced by games including Dark Souls. Sayre also cited the Lost Woods sequences in The Legend of Zelda games, particularly Breath of the Wild, as an influence on the emphasis placed on exploration and obscured spaces.

The game was developed using Unreal Engine 4, with Maya and Substance Painter used to create assets and FMOD used for its audio implementation. Jim Fowler composed its soundtrack.

MWM Interactive announced in September 2019 that it was expanding from virtual-reality publishing into conventional video games and would publish Creature in the Well as part of that direction. The game was released for Windows, Nintendo Switch and Xbox One on September 6, 2019. A PlayStation 4 version followed on March 31, 2020. A digital soundtrack and art book were released on the same date; the art book contains concept material and commentary by Volker and Sayre.

== Reception ==
Reception

Aggregate scores
Aggregator	Score
Metacritic	76/100 (NS); 82/100 (PC); 78/100 (XONE); 81/100 (PS4)
OpenCritic	58%

Review scores
Publication	Score
GameSpot	8/10
Destructoid	8/10
Nintendo Life	8/10
GameCritics	6.5/10

According to review aggregator Metacritic, Creature in the Well received "generally favorable" reviews on all four platforms. OpenCritic reported an average score of 76 out of 100, with 58% of critics recommending the game.

Jordan Ramée of GameSpot praised the way later rooms developed the game's central mechanic through hazards, timing challenges and different forms of ball manipulation. He preferred the faster encounters to some of its more conventional puzzles, writing that rapid movement and calculated ricochets could make combat resemble a hack-and-slash game despite the absence of conventional attacks. Lauren Morton of PC Gamer described Creature in the Well as combining pinball, dungeon crawling, puzzles and elements of bullet hell games. She liked the variety of its rooms and the ability to leave difficult optional challenges and return to them later.

CJ Andriessen of Destructoid considered the game closer mechanically to Breakout than traditional pinball. He liked the interaction between the game's charging and striking tools and the experimentation encouraged by different equipment, but found that puzzle formats began repeating despite the game's relatively short length.. Ramée also liked the range of equipment, particularly tools intended for individual dungeon mechanics, but criticized healing and permanent upgrades as comparatively limited.

Andriessen regarded the high-contrast environments, strong colour palettes and psychedelic influences as one of the game's strengths. Imran Khan of Game Informer singled out the artwork, influenced by Mike Mignola, and also praised the soundtrack and desert setting. Ollie Reynolds of Nintendo Life liked the comic-book presentation and the designs of its environments and characters.

Reynolds found the game challenging without becoming excessively difficult, although he thought the opening areas suffered from pacing problems while the mechanics were being introduced. Andriessen found several later challenges overly difficult and disliked the penalty for failure; he also criticized repeated puzzle layouts. Brad Gallaway of GameCritics was less enthusiastic, finding that similar rooms and objectives made the game increasingly repetitive. He liked its colour palette and presentation but thought its mechanics changed too little over the course of the game.

Ramée thought its antagonist and dungeon structure gave the adventure personality but found the surrounding lore to be uninteresting. Gallaway described the narrative as functional but thin. He did, however, like the presentation of the Creature principally through eyes and limbs emerging from darkness.

=== Accolades ===
At the 2020 Independent Games Festival, Creature in the Well was one of six finalists for Excellence in Visual Art. It also received an honorable mention in the Excellence in Design category.
