= The Room Tribute =

2010 flash video game

- The game mocks the movie's dialogue, such as its overuse of the greeting "Oh hi".
- Developer(s): Newgrounds
- Publisher(s): Newgrounds
- Programmer(s): Tom Fulp
- Artist(s): Jeff Bandelin
- Composer(s): Chris O'Neill
- Engine: Adobe Flash
- Platform(s): Web browser
- Release: September 3, 2010
- Genre(s): Point-and-click adventure game
- Mode(s): Single-player

The Room Tribute (also known as The Room: The Game) is a point-and-click adventure game released on September 3, 2010, that serves as an unofficial adaptation of the 2003 film The Room directed by Tommy Wiseau. It was programmed by Newgrounds founder Tom Fulp, with artwork by Newgrounds staff member Jeff "JohnnyUtah" Bandelin, and music by animator Chris "OneyNG" O'Neill. The game was designed in the style of 16-bit graphics, much like similar games based on the films Tremors and The Hunger Games for Newgrounds' own 2010 and 2012 April Fools jokes.

== Gameplay ==
The Room Tribute is a graphic adventure game with a point and click interface. The player assumes the role of Johnny, a banker in San Francisco, as he goes about his daily life – showering, going to work and pleasing his future wife Lisa. The game is divided up into several levels, each of which takes the form of a new day. Each level begins with Johnny being required to bathe and ends with him going to bed; in between, Johnny is tasked with various missions, which usually involve him engaging in mundane activities such as meeting friends for coffee, buying new clothes and playing catch. When not on a mission, the player is given free roam over a small area of San Francisco, which includes a park, several stores and the homes of Johnny's friends Mark and Denny. There are several side quests that the player can engage in when not on missions, such as reading Denny's daily diary entries or finding ten hidden spoons, which unlocks an extended ending to the game.

== Plot ==
For the most part, the game follows the plot of the movie: amiable banker Johnny helps his friends with their day-to-day problems while preparing for his wedding to his future wife, Lisa. When he discovers that Lisa is cheating on him with his best friend Mark, Johnny is outraged and ultimately kills himself. The game diverges from the film by only showing the events from Johnny's point of view. The player controls Johnny as he engages in activities that were only referred to in the film, such as his taking on a mystery client at his bank and his turning over drug dealer Chris-R to the police. The game also contains several in-jokes that attempt to provide backstories and account for idiosyncrasies in the film and its story. For example, a scene in the game's final level attempts to explain the inexplicable disappearance of supporting character Peter from the final act by revealing that an escaped Chris-R, in an act of revenge for his arrest, stole Johnny's car during the party and killed Peter in a hit and run.

The game begins with a prologue, showing Lisa and Denny at Johnny's grave (a statue of Tommy Wiseau) and then segueing into a level that occurs a day before the main action of the movie begins, in which Johnny learns that an earthquake has sealed San Francisco off from the rest of the state. The final level of the game permits players to "tie up" loose plot threads left hanging at the end of the film, such as the fate of Chris-R and Johnny's contentious relationship with his superiors at the bank. The game also includes an epilogue revealing that Johnny was, in fact, an alien being inhabiting a human body; after Johnny's "suicide", he returns to his mother ship, a giant mechanical spoon orbiting the Earth, and laments how he and his fellow extraterrestrials may never understand human life. Johnny and two of his fellow aliens then assume forms resembling a naked Tommy Wiseau and begin dancing, ending the game.

Should the player collect each of the hidden spoons throughout the game, rather than simply dance during the climax the aliens fire a ray gun at Earth that reshapes the planet into a giant spoon.

== Reception ==
Entertainment Weekly called the Flash game "as addictive as scotchka!". The game has also received positive reviews from TIME, Wired, Destructoid, The Escapist, Bitmob, Infinite Lives, Westword, Game Culture, and Geeks of Doom.

In co-star Greg Sestero's memoir, The Disaster Artist, Sestero stated that during the filming of The Room, he came up with the idea of having Mark be an undercover narcotics police officer to account for the disparate elements of his character, but the idea was rejected by Wiseau. Sestero "had a good laugh" when playing the game and seeing that its developers had given Mark a similar backstory by portraying him as a narcissistic hedonist.
