= The Behemoth =

American video game development company

- The mascot and logo for The Behemoth
- Type: Private
- Industry: Video games
- Founded: May 27, 2003; 23 years ago
- Founder: John Baez; Dan Paladin; Tom Fulp
- Headquarters: San Diego, California, U.S.
- Area served: Worldwide
- Key people: John Baez (CEO); Dan Paladin (CFO); Tom Fulp (secretary)
- Products: Alien Hominid; Castle Crashers; BattleBlock Theater; Pit People; Alien Hominid Invasion; Behemoth
- Number of employees: 20 (2024)
- Website: thebehemoth.com

The Behemoth is an American video game development company that was founded in 2003 by John Baez, artist Dan Paladin, and programmers Tom Fulp, Brandon LaCava, and Nick Dryburgh. The Behemoth development studio is located in San Diego, California. The company is known for producing simple games with Paladin's signature 2D style. Its games are also known for their heavy arcade inspirations, especially among their early games, emulating genres common on the Neo Geo in particular (which Fulp is a noted fan of).

== History ==
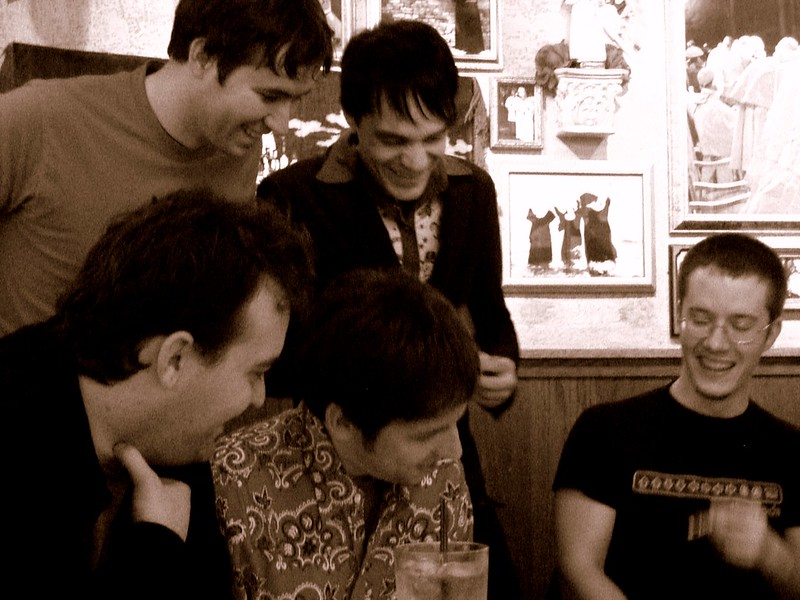
The Behemoth in 2007

During August 2002, Tom Fulp and Dan Paladin collaborated in creating the Flash game Alien Hominid for Newgrounds. The game has since become extremely popular and generated over twenty million hits. Later in the year, Paladin was working on developing a console video game when co-worker John Baez approached him. He was a fan of Alien Hominid and asked Paladin if he was interested in developing the game for consoles. When Baez offered to produce the game, Fulp and Paladin eventually agreed, recruited LaCava and Dryburgh, and formed The Behemoth in 2003. Several details in their games reveal a connected universe between all of them.

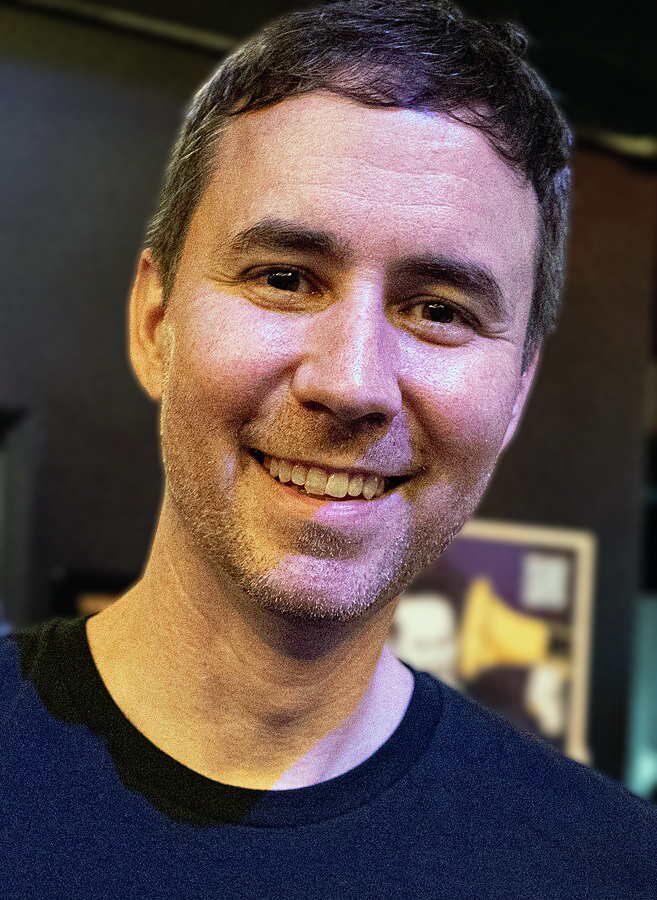
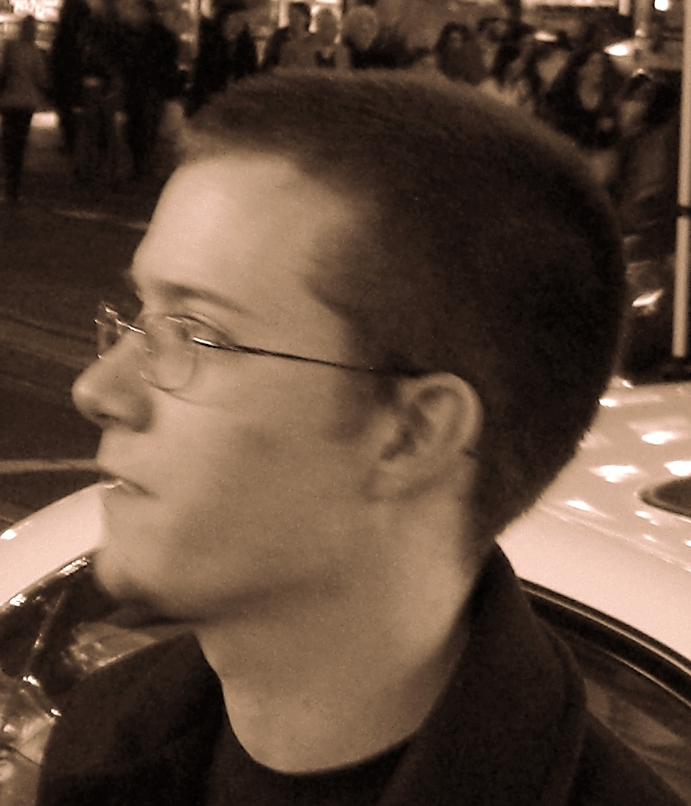
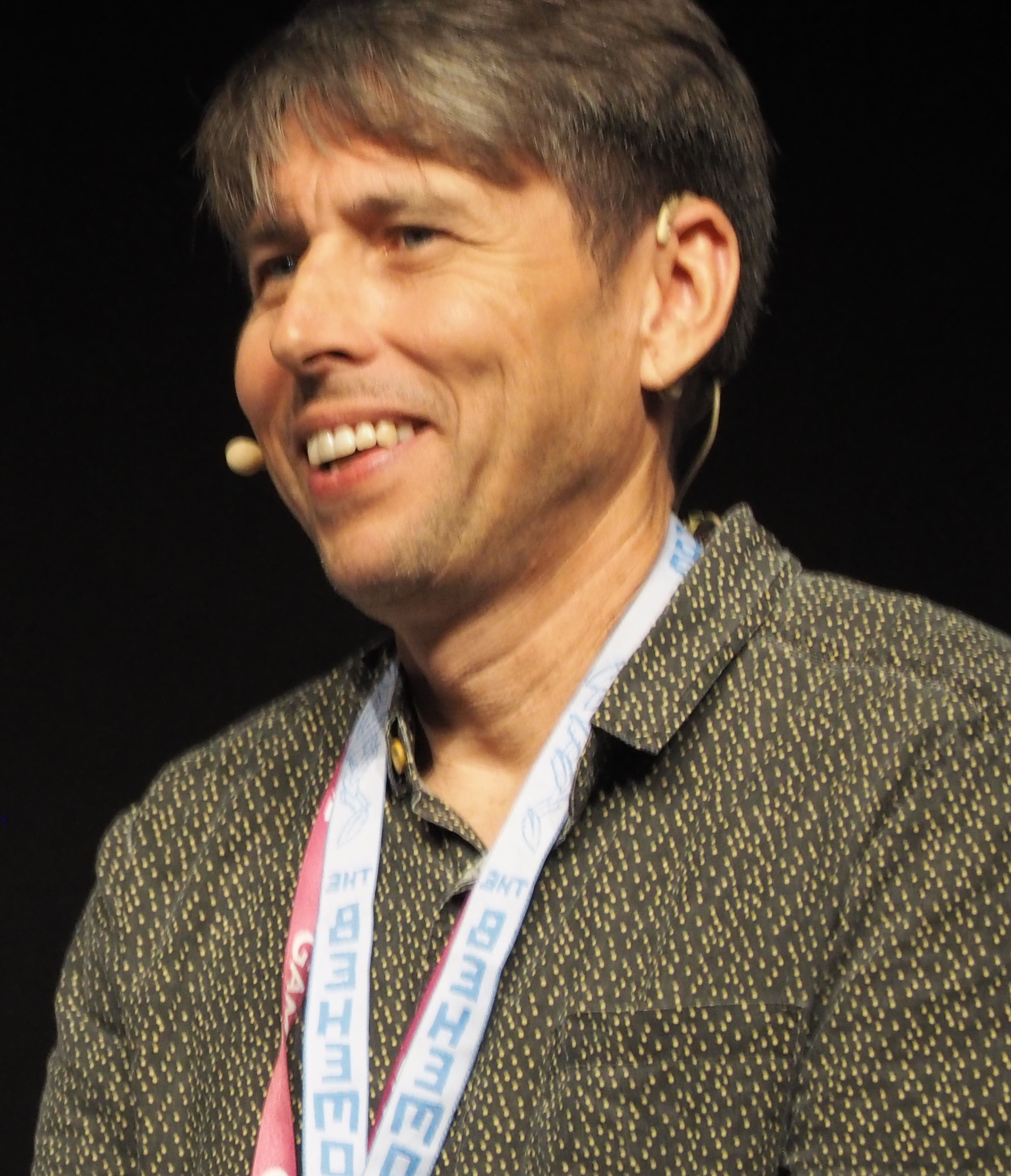
From left to right: Tom Fulp, Dan Paladin, and John Baez.

Their first console game, Alien Hominid, gained critical acclaim by the media and the members of The Behemoth quickly gained status as indie developers focused on bringing old-school styles of video games back into mainstream gaming. Some of the minigames from Alien Hominid were ported to iOS in 2011.

The Behemoth's second game, Castle Crashers, was released August 27, 2008, originally for the Xbox Live Arcade service, eventually re-releasing for the PlayStation 3 on August 31, 2010, and Microsoft Windows/OS X on September 26, 2012. Since its release on Xbox Live Arcade, Castle Crashers has become one of the most downloaded games, with over 2 million copies sold as of year-end 2010.

A third title, BattleBlock Theater, was released on April 3, 2013 on Xbox Live Arcade. The Windows, Linux, and macOS versions of BattleBlock Theater were released on Steam on May 15, 2014.

Pit People is a turn-based strategy game that was released for early access on Steam and was released for Xbox One on January 13, 2017. It was released on March 2, 2018.

The Behemoth had long teased a "Game 5", which was announced in January 2020 as Alien Hominid Invasion, which the developers said was not a remake or remaster of the original Alien Hominid but introduces new mechanics as an arcade shooter. It was released on November 1, 2023.

In 2024, The Behemoth released an endless runner titled Behemoth on Steam. It allows players to take control of their mascot chicken. The same year, they also announced an "update roadmap" for all their previously released titles.

== Games ==
Year	Title	Genre	Platform(s)	Additional note(s)
2004	Alien Hominid	Run-and-gun	PlayStation 2, GameCube, Xbox, Game Boy Advance, Web (Adobe Flash Player demo)	
2007	Alien Hominid 360	Run-and-gun	Xbox 360	Remastered port, originally titled Alien Hominid HD
2008	Castle Crashers	Side-scrolling hack-and-slash	Xbox 360, PlayStation 3, Windows, macOS	
2011	Super Soviet Missile Mastar	Side-scrolling shooter	iOS	Minigame originally included in Alien Hominid
2011	Alien Hominid: PDA Games	Platform	iOS	Minigame originally included in Alien Hominid
2013	Battleblock Theater	Comedy platform	Xbox 360, Windows, macOS, Linux	
2015	Castle Crashers Remastered	Side-scrolling hack-and-slash	Xbox One, Windows, macOS, PlayStation 4, Nintendo Switch	Remastered port
2018	Pit People	Role-playing strategy	Xbox One, Windows	
2023	Alien Hominid Invasion	Run-and-gun	Xbox Series X/S, Xbox One, Windows, Nintendo Switch, PlayStation 4, PlayStation 5	
2023	Alien Hominid HD	Run-and-gun	Xbox Series X/S, Xbox One, Windows, Nintendo Switch, PlayStation 4, PlayStation 5	Remastered port
2024	Behemoth	Bullet hell, Endless runner, Side scroller	Windows	
