= BattleBlock Theater =

2013 video game

- Developers: The Behemoth; Big Timber Studio
- Publishers: Xbox 360; Microsoft Studios; Windows, OS X, Linux; The Behemoth
- Designers: Tom Fulp; Dan Paladin
- Platforms: Xbox 360, Windows, Linux, Mac OS X
- Release: Xbox 360: WW: April 3, 2013; Windows: WW: May 15, 2014; OS X: WW: June 18, 2015
- Genre: Platform
- Modes: Single-player, multiplayer

BattleBlock Theater is a 2013 platform game developed by The Behemoth and published by Microsoft Studios for Xbox 360, Microsoft Windows, Mac OS X and Linux. It is the third title from The Behemoth, following Alien Hominid and Castle Crashers. The game was released on Xbox Live Arcade on April 3, 2013, and later temporarily made free via Games with Gold on July 16, 2014. On July 26, 2024, a quality-of-life update and future console releases were announced for the game.

== Gameplay ==
In BattleBlock Theater, players control a prisoner as they are forced to play through deadly puzzle levels. Controls are simple, with the game largely consisting of running, jumping and punching. Levels are made up of various types of blocks, such as collapsing blocks, sticky walls, bouncy volcanic rocks and deadly spikes, and also feature hazards such as water and deadly creatures.

The main mode in the game is Story Mode, which can be played solo or cooperatively with a second player. This mode can be played either in normal mode (with checkpoints) or insane mode (no checkpoints, meaning if the player dies, they have to restart the level). During cooperative play, players are able to work together to overcome obstacles, which includes throwing them across gaps, using their heads as platforms and helping each other get up ledges, although there is just as much opportunity of partner sabotage. Story mode consists of various worlds each with a set of levels. In order to progress to the next world, players need to collect gems (which can also be used to unlock new customizable parts) and complete a 'Finale' timed boss level. Beating a "Finale" level not only unlocks the next chapter, but also unlocks a set of three bonus levels for the chapter you had just beaten known as "Encore" levels. These levels are optional. Whenever a level is beaten, the player can move onto the next level like normal, but can also skip the next level and go to the one after, meaning that not all main levels are required for beating a chapter. Players can also collect balls of yarn which they can use to bribe cat guards and unlock new weapons, such as hand grenades, vacuum cleaners, dart guns, and many more. Collecting all gems and the yarn in a fast time will get the player an A++ grade for the level, which yields two extra gems. Despite using a grading system, the lowest score you can get on any given level is a C, with the other scores being B, A, and A++.

In some levels, players can also have a chance to get a golden hat, which pops up in a random location at a random time, and are each worth ten extra gems. However, when the player dies, the golden hat they are carrying will stay at the point they had died (or be destroyed, depending on where it lands) until the player picks it up again.

Arena mode is a competitive mode for up to four players, which is played in teams of 2. There are several match types including:

Player 1 on top of the vent is waiting while player 2 is flying via the lava block.

- Soul Snatcher: Steal an enemy soul and run away. Capture and hold the enemy's souls to gain points. Kill or step on a carrier to release their souls to roam the level.
- Muckle: Beat and kill the enemy team to earn the players' team points.
- Challenge: Score the best time on a given level.
- King of the Hill: Stand on the crown blocks to gain the player's team points.
- Color the World: Color more blocks than the other team.
- Grab the Gold: Grab more gold from the golden whale than the other team and deposit it in the flying safe to score points for the player's team.
- Ball Game: Get the ball in the basket.
- Capture the Horse: Ride the opposing team's horse to the team's stables to gain points for the player's team.

BattleBlock Theater also has support for custom heads in the PC version of the game. Inserting 128x128 PNG files into a folder titled: "Userfaces" gives them the option to use any image they want for your character's head.

Along with a time attack mode, the game also features a level editor, which allows players to create their own stages for any game type. These levels can be assembled into a playlist, consisting of various Adventure and Arena levels, and uploaded to the community for others to download. There is also additional content unlocked for players who also own Castle Crashers and Alien Hominid HD.

== Plot ==
The game begins with the narrator (voiced by Will Stamper) telling the adventures of the hundreds of friends aboard the S.S. Friendship, as well as Hatty Hattington, who is known as "best friend to one and all". After encountering a heavy storm, the S.S. Friendship becomes shipwrecked on a mysterious, seemingly abandoned island, whereupon most of the friends go missing. Upon waking up from the wreck, the player character seeks shelter from the storm in a dilapidated theater.

Upon coming to, it is revealed that the entire crew of the S.S. Friendship is being held prisoner by cats, with Hatty, wearing a glowing top hat, as their apparent new leader. The player is then released from their cell and forced into deadly games by the feline wardens. As the player completes challenges, they find gems which are spent on unlocking fellow crew members to play as in these theater performances. Appearing to be possessed by the hat's unknown powers, Hatty begins working for the cats and against the player.

As the player progresses, the narrator reveals more about the theater. Hundreds of years before the player got shipwrecked on the island, Purrham Furbottom, a theatrical aficionado, sought to build the world's greatest theater. The opening night saw the most jaw-dropping feats and thrills the likes of which were never seen before, making the theater an overnight success. However, Furbottom did not allow intermissions in the theater, and after an untold amount of time watching the show, he died after "pooping himself to death on the way to the bathroom." Since then, his top hat has been passed down to various others, who were each revered by the cats as their leader, and who each met with grim fates of their own. The hat, the narrator theorizes, is haunted by the grief and sorrow of each of its past wearers, and Hatty is its current victim, having sunk into a depression while being surrounded by the many gems the player has accrued, without doing anything to help the state of the theater.

Eventually, the cats grow tired of Hatty's inaction, and begin rioting, striking, and more, while the player's challenges grow increasingly difficult. As the theater deteriorates further, the narrator provides encouragement to the player and continues to shed light on the cats' mental state, which grows more unstable as time progresses. The narrator also instructs the player to enter The Vault, which houses Hatty and all the gems the player has spent, before the cats kill Hatty and the rest of the crew, starting the madness over again.

After completing the final set of challenges inside the Vault, the player breaks into Hatty's throne room. Hatty does not budge, so the player carries him out of the crumbling theater as the crew of the S.S. Friendship orchestrates a mass breakout. Everyone manages to make it back to the boat amidst the chaos, escaping the island and the cats that reside there. The cats try to foil the player's escape, but are shot by the others with guns. As the player celebrates with hot cocoa on the ship, they try to cheer up Hatty, who the narrator says that he would not move, blink, respond to hugs, or talk. He also asks "Where has he gone to? Where?", referring back to Hatty's death during the riot at The Vault. The narrator sings a sad song as the credits roll, before quickly recovering and singing a nonsensical, upbeat song, rocking the boat and flinging Hatty into the sea, where he sinks to the bottom. The hat lands on his head and begins glowing green as opposed to its usual red, and shoots a beam skyward, where it sends the boat flying and continues into space, where it vaporizes Alien Hominid from the game of the same name and a bear that appeared during the narrator's upbeat song, foreshadowing the events of Pit People. The narrator claims to understand what just happened but does not explain, sending the game back to the title screen.

== Development ==
John Baez has said that BattleBlock Theater was inspired by Alien Hominid's PDA games. It took 5 years to develop. The company originally revealed an early playable version of the game, originally code-named Game #3, at the Tokyo International Anime Festival on March 16, 2009 with a trailer of gameplay footage. The game was released for Xbox Live Arcade and Steam. The game features user-generated music from the Newgrounds community and narration by Newgrounds contributor Will Stamper.

On July 26, 2024, a free update for BattleBlock Theater was announced, adding support for high resolutions, uncapped frame rates, increased audio bitrate, bug fixes and extended controller support. Additionally, ports to modern consoles were announced.

== Reception ==
Reception

Aggregate score
| Aggregator | Score | |
| Aggregator | PC | Xbox 360 |
|---|---|---|
| Metacritic | 85/100 | 85/100 |

Review scores
| Publication | Score | |
| Publication | PC | Xbox 360 |
|---|---|---|
| Destructoid | N/A | 9/10 |
| Edge | N/A | 8/10 |
| Electronic Gaming Monthly | N/A | 9/10 |
| Eurogamer | N/A | 9/10 |
| Game Informer | N/A | 9/10 |
| GameRevolution | N/A | 4/5 |
| GameSpot | N/A | 8.5/10 |
| GameTrailers | N/A | 8.1/10 |
| Hardcore Gamer | 4.5/5 | 4.5/5 |
| IGN | N/A | 7.8/10 |
| Joystiq | N/A | 4.5/5 |
| Official Xbox Magazine (US) | N/A | 9/10 |
| PC Gamer (UK) | 86% | N/A |
| Polygon | N/A | 8.5/10 |
| Digital Spy | N/A | 3/5 |
| Metro | N/A | 9/10 |

BattleBlock Theater received "favorable" reviews on both platforms according to the review aggregation website Metacritic. GamesRadar+ praised the XBLA version's varied stages and extensive multiplayer modes. Destructoid called the same console version "a hallmark of excellence". Eurogamer called it "a masterclass in pure game design." IGN praised the same console version's inventive level design, but criticised the platforming gameplay in comparison to other 2D indie platfomers released around the same time such as Super Meat Boy and Braid.

Metro gave the XBLA version nine out of ten and called it "The Behemoth's best game yet and a hilarious mix of co-op platforming and absurdly entertaining multiplayer madness." GameZone also gave it nine out of ten and said, "If you want to have some mindless fun while an eccentric voice does its best to criticize you for your failures, BattleBlock Theater is ready to fulfill those needs." National Post gave it 8.5 out of 10 and said, "Playing an $18 game like BattleBlock Theater leaves a fellow feeling like he's been hosed on nearly every $60 game he's ever bought." 411Mania gave it 8.4 out of 10 and said, "If you’ve liked previous Behemoth games, Battleblock Theater [sic] will be right up your alley. The charm of past titles is there and the platforming is a solid experience. The game is definitely worth a look if you own a[n] Xbox 360." The Digital Fix gave it eight out of ten and said, "Games have been around long enough to poke fun at themselves and their cinematic predecessors, and while other titles like Viewtiful Joe and Saints Row: The Third have both got their fair share of jollies from doing this, it's arguable that no game until now as done so with such vigour as BattleBlock Theater." The Escapist similarly gave it four stars out of five and called it "A refreshingly upbeat platformer that puts silliness and fun above all else. The gameplay is easy to grasp for platforming veterans, while the massive amount of content and alternate game modes ensure you'll be entertained for hours. You also may never look at your cat quite the same way again." Slant Magazine gave the PC version four stars out of five, saying, "With so many amusing ways to live and die, the question in this theater isn't 'To be or not to be?' but 'How much longer can I play for?'" However, Digital Spy gave the XBLA version three stars out of five, saying, "There's some good fun to be had with BattleBlock Theater and it's a mostly charming title. But its fair share of problems hold it back from being an unequivocally entertaining, must-have game."
