= Tom Fulp =

American programmer (born 1978)

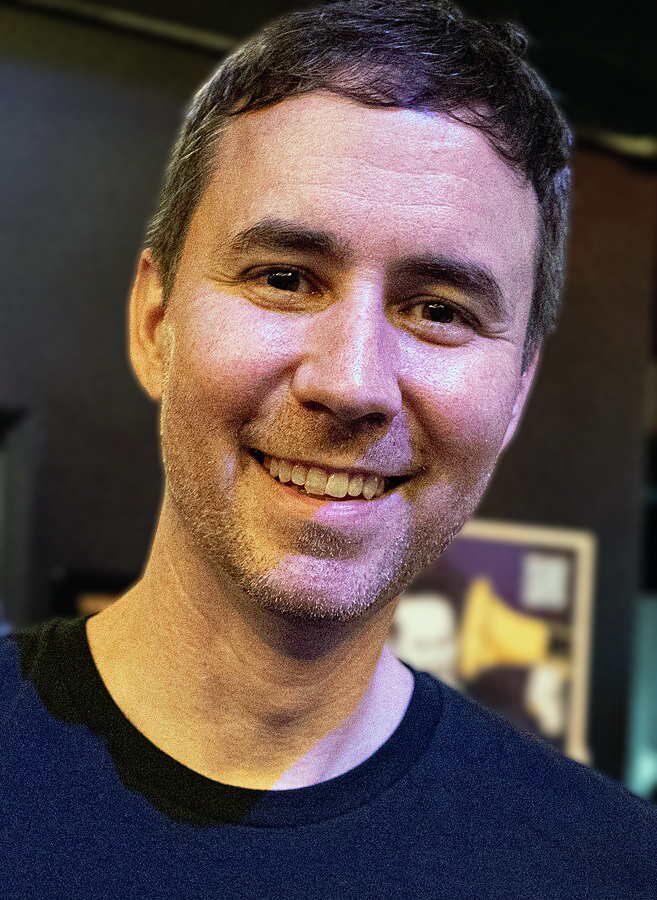
- Fulp in 2024
- Born: Thomas Charles Fulp; April 30, 1978 (age 48); Philadelphia, Pennsylvania, U.S.
- Education: Drexel University
- Occupation: Programmer
- Known for: Creator of Newgrounds; Co-owner of The Behemoth
- Spouse: April Fulp (m. 2007)
- Children: 2

Thomas Charles Fulp (born April 30, 1978) is an American programmer and flash animator. He created the website Newgrounds and co-founded the video game company The Behemoth.

Fulp has been credited with "changing the landscape of the Internet forever" by kickstarting the browser game scene in the late 1990s, both with the releases of his own advanced Flash games and the launch of the Newgrounds Portal, one of the first sites that allowed creators to easily share their creations with a large online audience. Fulp is also known for his browser game preservation work.

== Biography ==
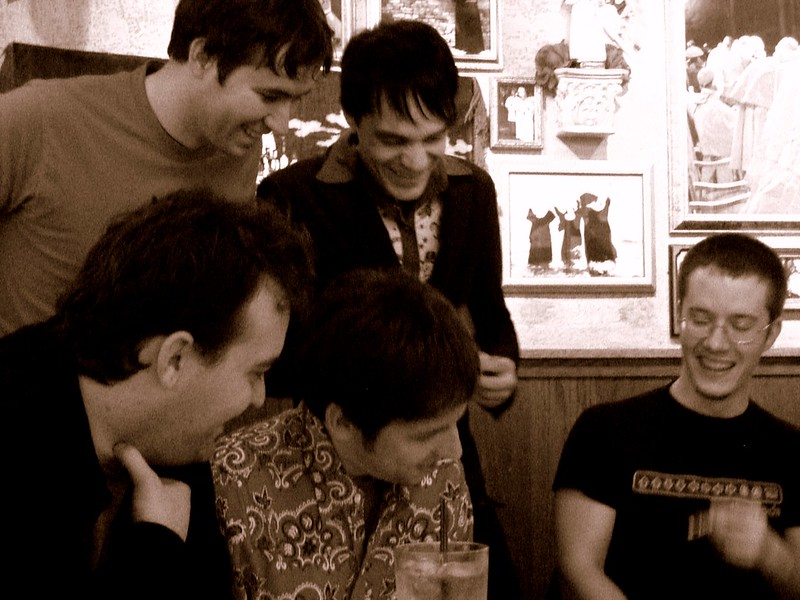
Fulp (upper left) with the Behemoth in 2007

Fulp was born and raised in Perkasie, Pennsylvania, on April 30, 1978. In 1991, at age 13, Fulp launched a Neo Geo fanzine called New Ground and sent issues to approximately 100 members of a club originating on the online service Prodigy. Using a hosting service, he launched a website called New Ground Remix in 1995, which increased in popularity during the summer of 1996 after Fulp created the BBS games Club a Seal and Assassin, after graduating from Pennridge High School. Eventually, this site turned into Newgrounds.com.

In 1999, Fulp created the game Pico's School in Macromedia Flash 3, before the launch of the scripting language ActionScript that subsequent Flash game developers would use. The game "exhibited a complexity of design and polish in presentation that was virtually unseen in amateur Flash game development" until then and has been credited both with helping kickstarting the Flash games scene and launching Newgrounds as a "public force".

Fulp co-created the Flash game Alien Hominid, which he later developed for consoles under The Behemoth, and the console game Castle Crashers.

Fulp received the Pioneer award at the 2021 Game Developers Choice Awards for the creation of Newgrounds and for being a trailblazer of the Macromedia Flash games that helped define a generation of indie developers.

== Games ==
| Year | Title |
|---|---|
| 1997 | Club A Seal |
| 1998 | Telebubby Fun Land |
| 1999 | Beat up Backstreet Boys! |
| 1999 | Nene Interactive Suicide |
| 1999 | Pico's School |
| 1999 | Samurai Asshole |
| 1999 | UFA |
| 1999 | Pico vs Bear |
| 2000 | Pico vs. Überkids |
| 2001 | Disorderly |
| 2002 | Alien Hominid |
| 2002 | Chainsaw The Children |
| 2005 | Dad 'n Me |
| 2006 | Resident Pico |
| 2008 | Castle Crashers |
| 2010 | The Room Tribute |
| 2013 | BattleBlock Theater |
| 2018 | Pit People |
| 2021 | Drop Cannon |
| 2023 | Alien Hominid Invasion |
