= Dogfighter (2010 video game) =

DogFighter
- Developer: Dark Water Studios
- Publisher: Dark Water Studios
- Platform: Windows
- Release: June 14, 2010
- Genres: Combat flight simulator Third-person shooter
- Modes: Single player, multiplayer

DogFighter is an action aerial combat video game for Microsoft Windows.

Developed by independent video game developer Dark Water Studios based in Derry, Northern Ireland, DogFighter is digitally distributed through Valve's Steam game client for Windows. The game was released on June 14, 2010.

DogFighter is the first commercial video game title to use the Instinct Engine.

One hundred-twenty dedicated servers and 20 dedicated demo servers went online on August 17, 2010, hosted by Multiplay.

== Gameplay ==
DogFighter consists of single-player levels as well as multiplayer maps where players congregate online to play against one another. DogFighter features different aircraft varying in speed, agility and defense capabilities.

Players can play against up to 15 opponents in multiplayer game modes such as "DeathMatch", "Team DeathMatch" and "Capture the Flag". Single-player modes include a "Tournament" mode where the player can achieve medals for events completed and "Survivor" where they can battle against waves of enemy craft.

A "Lone Wolf" game mode was released with update version 1.0.2.4 in both single-player and multi-player game modes.

A teaser trailer, released via YouTube on February 4, 2010 showcased a variety of craft and environments.

== Technology ==
DogFighter uses Instinct Engine 2.0, a cross-platform middleware solution created by Instinct Technology. The game also uses nVidia PhysX, Scaleform and Fmod.

Key technological features used in DogFighter include deferred rendering and seamless landscape/outdoor to indoor environment technologies.

== Reception ==
DogFighter was well received.

PC game review site Game Ramble awarded DogFighter a score of 9/10, praising it for having "All the fun and madness of a first person shooter but with added dimensions" as well as having stylist and detailed graphics. Christopher Holt, editor at GamePro, awarded DogFighter four out of five stars, stating it was "Fun, frenetic multiplayer combat; great aircraft roster and interesting arsenal fc; cool maps." It earned a score of 7/10 from video games blog RipTen, who praised the quality of its plane combat and weapon balancing. Kotaku praised DogFighter as being "Team Fortress 2 with an Air Supremacy Mode" as well as commenting positively on the games highly-responsive control system, graphics and simple premise.

Video game news website Gaming Bolt commented positively on DogFighter's overall visual aesthetic and extremely detailed plane models as well as its unique power-ups such as railguns and heat-seeking rockets. German technology and games website Zockon gave the German retail release of DogFighter 7.0/10.0, citing amongst its strengths a good mix of action and simulation controls, nicely built 3D models, strong mix of game modes and uncomplicated online multiplayer.

DogFighter was named sixth in the top ten games, by unit sales, for October 2010 on digital distribution platform Steam for selling 67,000 copies.

== Soundtrack ==
High Score Productions is credited with sound design, effects and soundtrack.

== Retail release ==
In March 2011, Berlin-based games publisher Just A Game released a boxed retail version of DogFighter. This version included an exclusive craft, "The Badger", and full localisation support for German-speaking countries.

In April 2011, Moscow-based games publisher Logrus released a boxed retail version of DogFighter. This version includes full localisation support for Russian-speaking countries.
