= Castle Crashers =

2008 video game

- Developer: The Behemoth
- Publishers: The Behemoth; Xbox 360; Microsoft Game Studios
- Designer: Dan Paladin
- Programmer: Tom Fulp
- Composer: Matthew Harwood
- Platforms: Xbox 360, PlayStation 3, Windows, OS X, Xbox One, Nintendo Switch, PlayStation 4
- Release: August 27, 2008: Xbox 360 August 27, 2008 PlayStation 3; NA: August 31, 2010; EU: November 3, 2010; JP: November 25, 2010 Windows, OS X September 26, 2012 Xbox One September 9, 2015 Switch, PS4 September 17, 2019
- Genre: Beat 'em up
- Modes: Single-player, multiplayer

Castle Crashers is a beat 'em up video game developed and published by The Behemoth for the Xbox 360. It was originally released on August 27, 2008 by Microsoft Game Studios via Xbox Live Arcade as part of the Xbox Live Summer of Arcade. A PlayStation 3 version was released in North America on August 31, 2010, and November 3, 2010, in Europe via the PlayStation Network. A Microsoft Windows and OS X version, exclusive to Steam, was released on September 26, 2012. The game is set in a fictional medieval universe in which a dark wizard steals a mystical crystal and captures four princesses. Four knights are charged by the king to rescue the princesses, recover the crystal, and bring the wizard to justice. The game includes music created by members of Newgrounds.

On June 15, 2015, The Behemoth announced Castle Crashers Remastered for Xbox One, while the Steam version received it in the form of a free update. The remastered version features higher quality textures, higher frame-rate, performance improvements, and an additional mini-game. This version later released for the Nintendo Switch and PlayStation 4 on September 17, 2019. On August 6, 2025, the Painter Boss Paradise DLC was released for the Steam version of the game.

== Gameplay ==
Four players can play at once.

Castle Crashers is a side-scrolling beat 'em up that incorporates a small number of role-playing video game elements. After selecting a character, the player then selects a starting stage through an overworld map. After completing a stage, the player has the choice to revisit it or to move to another stage. The map also displays shops where the player character can buy items and weapons using coins gained from defeated foes, bosses, and chests. Arena stages can be unlocked where the player character can take on challenges to unlock additional characters such as the villager.

Castle Crashers supports cooperative gameplay for up to four players, either locally or online. The game progression in terms of what stages are unlocked is defined by the player who is furthest along, although some levels require all players to have unlocked them before proceeding to them; however, each player character will gain experience points and acquire wealth, weapons, and animal orbs independently as they progress with the rest of the party. In each stage, the player can use melee and combination attacks. Each character has a unique magical ability (e.g. Red Knight can create lightning bolts, Green Knight attacks with poison clouds, Blue Knight shoots out ice shards) and a health meter that, if drained from enemy attacks, will cause the character to fall in battle. In single player mode, this ends the stage; however, in cooperative multiplayer other players may attempt to revive the downed character.

Characters gain experience points by damaging foes which allow the character to level up. Level 99 is the highest level. Each level gained allows the player to allocate points towards the character's four basic combat attributes. Certain level advances also grant new combination attacks. Progress is tracked for each of the playable characters separately. The character's magic level is also tracked by a meter and regenerates over time. Numerous weapons can be found in the game, each that have various effects to the character's attributes when equipped. The player can find animal companions for their character that may assist in battle, improve the character's attributes, or provide another special ability such as fruits from defeated foes. The player can also pick up sandwiches in battle, which turn the player character into a muscular version of themselves, increasing attack power and opening certain doors. Beating the game unlocks Insane Mode, where enemies and bosses are ten times stronger and allows access to the Insane Store, where player can buy powerful but expensive weapons and animal orbs. The prices in the Insane Store were lowered in the remastered edition.

Each version of the game has two minigames. In Arena, the first minigame, player characters attempt to survive through several waves of enemies, or fight each other. This minigame is available on all versions. The Xbox 360, Mac OS X and Microsoft Windows versions feature a minigame called "All You Can Quaff," a button-mashing contest to attempt to eat as much food as possible. The PlayStation 3 version, however, features a Volleyball minigame for up to four players and four AI characters. The remastered version features a board game-like minigame called "Back Off Barbarian" where up to four players must avoid enemies and try to survive for as long as possible.

== Plot ==
Castle Crashers is set in a fictional medieval universe. It begins with the character the player chose at the character selection menu attending a party in a king's castle. During the party, a dark wizard arrives, stealing a mystical gem and capturing four princesses. The king sends the non-player-character “grey knights” and the player to retrieve the gem, rescue his daughters, and defeat the wizard in battle. The knights encounter several enemies along the way, including other knights, multiple encounters with a cyclops and the conehead groom (ingame, coneheads are a group of people who wear dark grey armor, with the headpiece being very cone-shaped.), barbarians, thieves, trolls, a giant "catfish", bears, fencers, an industrial prince, ninja pirates, desert bandits, skeletons, eskimos, fish men, anthropomorphic corn, demons, cultists, imps, slimes, bats, giant insects, a necromancer, a dragon, Medusa, a frost king, painter and aliens from Alien Hominid. As the player progress, they succeed in rescuing the princesses, and ultimately the journey culminates in a final showdown with the evil wizard. The player emerges victorious from the confrontation, having defeated the dark wizard, rescued all of the king's daughters, and recovered the mystical gem. The player then ride the reclaimed gem through several empty battlefields on their trip back to the castle. At the castle the king brings one of his daughters for one of the player(s) to kiss, her face is hidden throughout the entire game in the form of various visual gags. As with previous levels, the players fight to the death to claim a kiss from the princess. However, when the winner tries to do so this time, the princess is revealed to be a clown (A character that first appeared in an animation by Dan Paladin) that blankets the screen in the ending animation with penguins, weasels, kitties, hearts and rainbow beams.

== Development and marketing ==
Art for the game began with simplistic and crude drawings as reference for the game's lead artist, Dan Paladin. This image displays the early and final versions for the character “Frost King”.

Castle Crashers was first revealed on July 14, 2005, at San Diego Comic-Con under the working title Ye Olde Side-Scroller; however, the game did not receive its title until 2006 Comic-Con, when it was announced for Xbox Live Arcade. Though the original Comic-Con 2005 demo was shown running on a GameCube, no mention was made of a release on a Nintendo-based platform. It was released for the Xbox 360 on August 27, 2008. On July 23, 2009, The Behemoth announced that Castle Crashers would be coming to the PlayStation Network. The game was released on the PlayStation 3 in North America on August 31, 2010, and in Europe on November 3, 2010. A Microsoft Windows version exclusive to Steam was announced on August 16, 2012.

The game's art style was developed by The Behemoth's lead artist, Dan Paladin. As the team created new locales and characters, placeholder art was used as a template for look, size and scale of the final art. Paladin drew multiple partial renditions of a game asset, then selected one for finalization. Although Paladin was the primary source for much of the art, programmer Tom Fulp assisted with the game's art, creating some of the minion creatures for boss characters. Paladin cited River City Ransom as his primary inspiration for the game's art style, noting the character's expressions when damaged as a particular point of influence. Fulp added that several beat 'em ups from the 1980s and 90s influenced the game, such as Guardian Heroes, Final Fight, Golden Axe and Double Dragon. On the game's internal software, the music and sound used archaic Xbox files that are only hearable on foobar2000 and/or VLC Media Player, even on the Steam version. Much of the music for the game was created by Newgrounds users, with The Behemoth contracting over twenty individuals for their tracks. Paladin himself scored two of the tracks in the game. The soundtrack was made available for free on September 1, 2008, via the Newgrounds website. Development for the game took three years, starting after the release of Alien Hominid.

=== Downloadable content ===
The Xbox 360 version of the game features four downloadable content packs. On January 14, 2009, the King Pack downloadable content was released and added two characters, another animal orb and three weapons. On August 26, 2009, a second downloadable content pack known as the Necromantic Pack was released and further added two characters, one animal orb and two weapons, as well as a picture pack for Xbox Live profiles. Both packs are included as part of the full game on the PlayStation 3 version of Castle Crashers. Additionally, the title character from The Behemoth's previous title, Alien Hominid, is available to play on the Xbox 360 for those who have purchased Alien Hominid HD. As The Behemoth had no way of telling whether an individual had purchased the PlayStation 2 version of Alien Hominid, the character was included in the PS3 version free of charge. Writing on their blog, the developers explained "we are going to attempt what is the most fair and make the logical assumption that by this point everyone has the PS2 Alien Hominid, right?" The Behemoth announced A Pink Knight Pack, which features a Pink Knight, an unlockable character in the Xbox Live Arcade version of Super Meat Boy, and five new weapons on February 2, 2011. It was released for the PlayStation 3 on February 8, 2011, with a release on the Xbox 360 on August 27, 2011, along with the Blacksmith Pack which adds one additional character and five new weapons. All proceeds from the content will be donated to the Breast Cancer Research Foundation. If Xbox 360 players own both Castle Crashers and Behemoth's follow-up title, BattleBlock Theater, players can unlock Hatty Hattington, a new orb and three new weapons, as well as Castle Crashers content in BattleBlock Theater.

In July 2024, The Behemoth announced the Painter Boss Paradise DLC, 12 years after the game's previous DLC. The DLC includes new player and weapon artwork for all official characters and a new character Paint Junior. The DLC adds Steam workshop functionality for players to create and share custom skins. The DLC has been released on Steam on August 6, 2025, however it has not been confirmed whether or not the DLC will come to consoles.

=== Remastered ===
On June 15, 2015, The Behemoth announced Castle Crashers Remastered, a remastered version of the game for Xbox One, while the Steam version received it in the form of a free update. The remastered version features higher quality textures, uncapped frame-rate, multiplayer performance improvements, and an additional mini-game. The Behemoth later stated that a PlayStation 4 release was not in their plans due to the small team and limited resources.

However, on March 14, 2019, The Behemoth teased a picture via both their Twitter & Facebook accounts depicting four Nintendo Switch Joy-Con in the color of the four original Knights. This was followed on March 15, 2019, with a tweet with PlayStation 4 controllers; each with the controllers' light bars showing colors of each of the four original playable Knights, notably green, red, blue and orange. Both Twitter and Facebook posts state only "see you Tuesday for more things...".

In response to users' comments, The Behemoth responded with GIFs teasing confirmation of the users' predictions of a remastered PS4 release. On March 19, 2019, during PAX East, The Behemoth announced that Castle Crashers Remastered would come to both Nintendo Switch and PlayStation 4 due to popular demand, and there were demos during the event.

== Reception ==
Reception

Aggregate score
Aggregator	Score
Metacritic	X360: 82/100; PS3: 85/100; XONE: 83/100; NS: 77/100

Review scores
Publication	Score
1Up.com	B+
Eurogamer	8/10
GameSpot	8.5/10
GameTrailers	7.9/10
IGN	X360: 9/10; PS3: 8.5/10

Castle Crashers was well received on each platform. Metacritic reports aggregate scores of 82/100 on the Xbox 360 and 85/100 for the PlayStation 3. It has been a commercial success, with the Xbox 360 version selling over two million copies on the Xbox 360 alone as of year-end 2010. 2011's totals were over 2.6 million on Xbox Live Arcade alone. The PlayStation 3 version has also done well, moving over 181,000 in 2010. IGN editor Cam Shea ranked it third on his top 10 list of Xbox Live Arcade games. He praised it for being both a call-back to a much-loved genre and a great piece of game design. Additionally in a September 2010 ranking, IGN listed Castle Crashers fifth in their top twenty-five Xbox Live Arcade titles of all time. During the 12th Annual Interactive Achievement Awards, the Academy of Interactive Arts & Sciences nominated Castle Crashers for "Outstanding Achievement in Animation". In 2023, Time Extension included Castle Crashers Remastered on their top 25 "Best Beat 'Em Ups of All Time" list. It was voted 2008 Best Game of the Year at the Xbox Live Arcade Awards. Castle Crashers was also Xbox Live Arcade's best-selling title of 2008. Gaming Target's staff named the game as one of their "40 Games We'll Still Be Playing From 2008." By August 2019, ahead of release of the PlayStation 4 and Nintendo Switch version, the Behemoth reported that Castle Crashers had sold more than 20 million copies.

Reviewers universally praised the unique art style of Castle Crashers. GameSpot's Don Francis noted that the "crisp art design really makes the game shine." 1UP.com's Andrew Hayward noted that the game's hand-drawn characters, effects, and scenery make the game "shine." Dan Whitehead of Eurogamer stated the game's art was more detailed and polished than The Behemoth's previous title, Alien Hominid. The game's humor was generally lauded by reviewers. Writing for Gaming Target, Troy Matsumiya stated the game was "bigger and funnier" than Alien Hominid. Francis and IGN's Hilary Goldstein also praised the game's humor. The gameplay also received high marks from reviewers. GameTrailers' staff stated that the game has "a deceptive simplicity that sucks you right in." Goldstein praised the simplistic gameplay, and said the game was a modern throwback to classic beat 'em ups. He additionally noted the high replay value, and cited the game's four player multiplayer and number of unlockables as reasons to continually play the game.

Several reviewers expressed early frustration in regards to multiplayer connection issues, however these issues were resolved in a later title update to the game. Francis stated that the connection issues "handicap the multiplayer experience." "Despite trying all day and night on launch day, we were only able to get a couple of two-player games going for a couple of levels before the connections were lost" stated Whitehead. Hayward also reported slight connectivity issues in the PlayStation 3 version. The PlayStation 3 version of the game also received criticism from GameSpot's Carolyn Petit for its additional Volleyball game mode, who described it simply as "lousy."

=== Technical issues ===
Some users experienced problems finding available online games, as well as their Xbox 360 sometimes freezing when attempting to join an Xbox Live game, or while already in a game. "There are certain network settings," said Paladin, "where, if you're in a very specific network environment, it won't work with another person's connection and that's what's happening. But that's something we're already addressing by working with Microsoft to get a patch out as fast as possible." In addition to multiplayer problems, the game could also occasionally suffer from corrupted save files, causing players to lose character progress. In an interview with Joystiq, Tom Fulp and Dan Paladin of the Behemoth stated that they were working with Microsoft to get a patch released as soon as possible in order to fix the issues. A patch for the game was released on December 24, 2008, fixing glitches and exploits as well as resolving networking issues that were experienced at the game's launch. Similar networking problems have also been reported for the PlayStation 3 version of the game. The PlayStation 3 version of the game only allows one profile to be signed in per console, with additional players being unable to use their own progress rather than of the profile in use.
