= VSide =

vSide
- Developer: ExitReality
- Engine: Torque Game Engine (Modified Version 1.3.5)
- Platforms: Microsoft Windows; Mac OS X
- Release: May 15, 2006: The PCD Lounge May 15, 2006 vSide August 14, 2007
- Genres: Music and party-focused social virtual world
- Mode: Multiplayer (online only)

vSide was an Internet-based 3D virtual world that was launched on May 15, 2006. The game is in its public beta phase. However, the game appears to have been discontinued as of May, 2018. Initially developed by American studio Doppelganger, Inc., a studio founded in 2004, the game was acquired in June 2009 by ExitReality, which is the owner and developer. Inside the game's universe, users are called vSiders and can interact with each other through social networking, celebrity entertainment, virtual boutique shopping and self-expression. Membership is free.

ExitReality provides "next generation social entertainment" with vSide, where in-world activities and engagement focus on music, entertainment and fashion. vSide is designed to be an online social environment where teenagers can hang out in real-time with their friends in public and personal spaces. It is based both on professional and user-generated content or design. A major part of its concept is users hosting their own events for others to participate in. It has won the "2007 Top 100 Private Companies to Watch" award from the 2007 On Hollywood Conference and the "CNET Top Five Selection" from the Under The Radar Conference 2007.

In addition to encouraging teenagers to express themselves through personal spaces or "apartments", vSide also encourages users to express themselves though social gestures and connections, including who they hang out with, where they are "seen", where they base their personal space, and the activities that they engage in. vSide also offers an extensive character customization system with over five million different clothing combinations available for free. Avatars can be additionally personalized through the purchase of virtual apparel.

As with all communities, social status is important in the vSide community. Users can earn in-world status and climb a social ladder based on the number of friends they have, the number of new friends that they bring into the world and the activities they host or take part in. High social status in the world is visually represented through points so that users can immediately tell a new member of the community compared to a veteran user. High social status will gain entrance to VIP events, confer preferential access to personal spaces and allow for the acquisition of virtual goods not available to the average user.

== History ==
In March 2006 Doppelganger, Inc. released a preview of a new virtual game called The PCD Lounge after a development phase of "about ten months". Only a few people from the PCD Fan Club list were invited to try out the preview. At the end of March, a "preview refresh" was released with bug fixes and on May 15, 2006, The Lounge Beta officially launched. It was introduced as "the first virtual nightclub for teens" featuring the Pussycat Dolls and Interscope Records. In the beginning of The Lounge, the main revenue was "generated from music download sales and other merchandise, as well as billboard advertising space inside the virtual club" and "Credits" (short "Creds") to buy virtual clothing items were introduced. The virtual game was later renamed to "The Music Lounge".

In a sort of "swords into plowshares" moment, Littlefield, (Note: Founder Doppelganger, Inc.) wondered what Doom would be like if it were, first and foremost, a place for friends to hang out together. Thus was born the idea for Doppelganger, a virtual world hangout centered around music and nightlife.

— Wired.com

The Music Lounge became a success, grew, and was re-branded as vSide in the summer of 2007. At this point many things had changed from the original game. The online world was composed now of three cities, the old social status system called "respekt" was replaced with the current vPoint rank status and apartments, which could only be rented in The Music Lounge, could now be bought. More sponsors were added overtime like Tyra Banks, DJ AM and Degrassi and real-life brands such as Kitson, Rocawear, StarStyle and EDOC Laundry. One year after the launch of vSide, in August 2008, Doppelganger, Inc. was acquired for $40 million by Hip Digital Media but continued to run without noticeable changes for the users.

vSide ran stable for a year and a half with the addition of vHD, a store in which clothes made by users were sold, and some other additions to the game like the Sumo arena and Tetris-like machines. Unfortunately, in the beginning of 2009, Doppelganger was forced to lay-off a great deal of their staff due to financial problems and a few months after, they informed their community of the game's shutdown. Starting June, both vSide and vSide's forum were left un-moderated due to all of the staff no longer working for Doppelganger, Inc. Surprisingly, an unknown moderator appeared once in a while to clean up the messes that users caused. A few days before expected server shutdown, two community staff held a featured event called T.G.I.F. (Thank God It's Friday). This would be the last event held under Doppelganger ownership, but did not go that well thanks to some technical problems with offline systems in Doppelganger' headquarters. The virtual game's servers went offline first and a few days later, the game's forum and Doppelganger's official website went offline. Everything up to this period is considered by some as "vSide's Golden Age".

On July 31, 2009, ExitReality announced that it had acquired vSide for an undisclosed amount and the vSide forum came back online. The game itself was not immediately revived, instead the game's servers were moved from their existing location in the Doppelganger headquarters to a new host run by SoftLayer Technologies in Texas. After the servers were set up, a hidden section in the game's forum called "vSide Renaissance" appeared to selected users, for instance, Guides and Tech Experts before vSide's servers had been shut down. This section and the users in it worked together with the new ExitReality staff to test the server before opening it to the public. Later that year, vSide was opened to the public with a few changes to the vSide left by Doppelganger. The most notable change was that vSide no longer played its own music. The areas in the game with staff-broadcast music were replaced with SHOUTcast radio stations, which Doppelganger had already integrated into the game. Moderators and Promo Team members, were now users picked by the new staff.

Between the time vSide was re-opened to the public and the present, ExitReality has updated vSide with two more apartments and has added more items for users to purchase, like more clothing in the vHD Store and more furniture and decorations for the apartments. ExitReality often responds to requests on the forums, for example, the Dot Dorm A re-release and make-up were often demanded by the user base even before vSide's shutdown.

== Celebrities and brands ==
Doppelganger's strategy included inviting brands and celebrities to vSide for promotional purposes. Known artists as the Plain White T's, Maroon 5 or The All-American Rejects have visited vSide. ExitReality tries to continue this by inviting newcomers to vSide. Real-life clothing brands such as Rocawear and Kitson have virtual shops in vSide.

=== Celebrities ===
Since the appearance of bands members of The Pussycat Dolls in the early versions of the application, bands and solo artists, TV casts and other media personalities have made appearances in vSide. Due to Interscope Records and Downtown Records partnering with Doppelganger, known artists under these labels promoted themselves within vSide by holding events. For Instance, DJ AM has his own club in vSide based on the LAX nightclub in Los Angeles, which stays in one of vSide's districts even after his death. Not being limited to the club, Goldstein also performed in NewVenezia's main venue, the Interscope Lounge. On the other hand, the talk show host Tyra Banks has had her own studio built after the real set named "Tyra's Virtual Studio" in vSide. At this venue, weekly The Tyra Banks Show after-show parties were held. In 2008, a set of the TV show Degrassi: The Next Generation was integrated to a vSide district. During the "Degrassi Spirit Week", main characters and producers visited vSide to interact with fans by giving interviews and chatting at events. Degrassi: The Next Generation has become the first Canadian television series to launch a presence in vSide.

=== Brands ===
As of the last version of The Music Lounge, users are able to buy virtual apparel from Kitson and Rocawear. The sold items are textured after real-life clothing by the brands. As The Music Lounge was renamed vSide, other brands such as StarStyle and EDOC Laundry were added and now have a virtual appearance in the world. Downtown Records had its own venue in vSide as well, in which virtual merchandising was sold.

== World ==
vSide has three main "cities" or "districts". These districts are monitored by vSide moderators, often abbreviated as MODs. Unlike the apartments, the cities can not be directly decorated or changed by users. The cities are the main clubbing, shopping areas and venues for public events with artists. The three districts have different themes (e.g., the Anime/Japanese-themed RaiJuku).

=== Gateway ===
The Gateway is the first location vSide automatically takes the user after their first login. It contains tutorials about basic vSide features. The tutorials include information about basic avatar control, chatting, shopping, clubbing, safety features, apartments and friends. Three "secret" shirts spread around the Gateway are intended to encourage new players to find more vSide Secrets at the three main districts. The completion of the Gateway is optional.

=== NewVenezia ===
NewVenezia is the first-ever built vSide city. It used to be called San Francisco (Doppelganger, Inc. had its headquarters in San Francisco). vSiders often abbreviate NewVenezia and call it "NV". Its main venue is the Interscope Lounge, formerly PCD Lounge, where events are often held. The most recent event was held by Eli Lieb in September 2011. A box with former Pussycat Dolls members, which only the first hundreds of PCD Lounge users were granted access to, is on top of the club. A store selling virtual Pussycat Doll merchandising is situated next to the Interscope Lounge as of the first PCD Lounge build. NewVenezia is the vSide district that has changed the most since 2006. It has been undergoing small and large changes and redesigns; also, new venues, shops and secrets were added until the current state.

=== RaiJuku ===
RaiJuku (RJ) is one of the two new cities introduced in vSide Beta 1. Its architecture and urban planning is inspired by Harajuku and Shinjuku in Tokyo. The most popular game called "Sumo" is situated there (added in vSide Beta 6) as is vSide's Halloween Maze, which opens its official doors around Halloween. Celebrities including Kenna held their events in RaiJuku, furthermore, vSide's ex-goth DJ used to reside there. The apartment lobby of the Islands was added to RaiJuku as it is the city with the fewest apartment lobbies.

=== LaGenoaAires ===
LaGenoaAires (LGA) is the second new city introduced in vSide Beta 1. It is mainly affected by water and its buildings are mostly natural-coloured. According to a Terry Redfield's portfolio, "LaGenoa Aires was created based on reference from Italy, Spain and South America". In one of the in-game trivia questions it is referenced as being modeled after Buenos Aires, Argentina and Genoa, Italy. The first store with only user-designed clothes called vSide Houses of Designs (vHD) is located in LGA. It was announced in July 2008 and opened in Beta 6c. The Dot Grill from Degrassi: The Next Generation, modeled after the set of the TV show, is situated at LaGenoaAires.

=== Personal spaces ===
The personal spaces for users, also called "apartments", play an important role in the game. Users are able to buy and customize apartments for vPoints and/or vBux. There are nine apartments for sale, an additional one is still existing and accessible but not for sale anymore. Every vSider starts with a free basic apartment, the NV255 Loft. Every apartment is focussed on a unique type of vSider with unique needs. All apartments except the Islands are pre-built. The themes and purposes of the vSide apartments range from a club ("Club Rage") to an empty building space ("the Islands") for creative users who want to build their own apartments. According to Josh Michaels, the idea of apartment slots (before apartment ownership was introduced) was borrowed from an IRC chat room. As of vSide Beta 2, the game was slowly going to apartment ownership as customizing rooms was enabled.

=== Moderation ===
vSide is moderated by a selected group of people that supervise users' chats in-world in realtime. Moderators are able to suspend or ban users for inappropriate behavior. Abuse reports sent by vSiders get reviewed by moderators to take the necessary actions. During their moderating shifts, anonymous names, for example moderator1, are used. Moderators appear with a red staff username.

vSide Guides

=== Guides ===
Guides are long-time vSiders who expressed interest in helping new users with first user experience, giving tours and answering FAQs. These users wear a special yellow Guide shirt and have a Guide badge in-world, which they can easily equip in their inventory and automatically go into "Guide Mode" by doing that. Guides have the ability to see help calls of users on their server. Members of the Guide team also have a badge on vSide's forum. They were introduced in The Music Lounge Beta 9/10 between February and April 2007. At the beginning of the Guide program in the Music Lounge days, there was no official and public applications process for Guides. vSiders were hand-selected by maturity and knowledge about the game by Doppelganger staff and had to write an essay to apply for the position. In winter 2007, former Guides were selected to become Senior Guides. Their purpose was to assist and help (new) Guides as well as helping community team members at events by having the ability to fly attached to their role. Senior Guides also took part in reviewing Guide applications. The Senior Guide program was canceled in June 2008. vSiders can become a Guide by an application process that opens at different times.

vSide Tech Experts

=== Tech Experts ===
Tech Experts, like Guides, consist of a team that answer frequently asked questions, but unlike the Guides, the questions are more tech-oriented. They were introduced on 5 September 2008. The team members have a badge on vSide's Forum and are able to wear a special shirt in-world.

=== Promotional Team ===
The vSide Promotional Team, founded as a closed team in spring 2010, promotes vSide and introduces official events as held by Doppelganger community staff before the game's takeover. In 2011, it has been revamped to an open, forum-based approach, enabling interested members to share and coordinate their promotional activities with both other members and staff.

== Virtual currency and subscriptions ==
There are two different types of cash in vSide, which are available in different ways: vPoints and vBux. Unlike vBux, vPoints can be earned by "being an active vSider" and by participating in the community. Most things in vSide can be bought using either vPoints or vBux, but a few special items require one or the other. The current virtual currency system has been introduced in 2008. There is no official exchange rate, although in common exchanges between vSiders 100 vPoints equal 1 vBuck.

=== vPoints ===
vPoints are rewarded for being an active vSider by a "vPoints drip", exploring new areas or trying out new features. Experimenting to discover all the different ways vPoints can be earned is considered part of the fun. All vPoints earned in a user's virtual life add up to the "All-time vPoints", which determine a certain rank/level in vSide.

=== vBux ===
vBux is virtual currency which can be used to buy clothes, items for private spaces, and other things that make vSide life more fun. It can be purchased with a credit card, PayPal, and by mail. vBux can only be purchased or given by other users. vBux or virtual goods or services from the Environment cannot be sold in the real world.

=== Subscriptions ===
In July 2010, an optional subscription called vSub became available in vSide. This subscription consists of 1,050 vBux a month, 10% off clothes in vSide, exclusive clothes, a vSub headphone badge in-world and other member only items.

== Social networking and social media features ==
Screenshot of a vSide Web Profile

As the most virtual worlds, vSide includes social networking and social media elements such as custom profiles, forums and a blog. Corresponding to their virtual appearance, users are encouraged to things fill out their profiles with personal interests, taking pictures in-game for their image gallery and interacting by making comments on other user's web profiles. The vSide Forums are the game's main information platform. Staff announcements, for instance, maintenances, updates or issues with the client are being published mainly on the forums. While they are rather uninteresting for new users except for their help section, "veteran users" often post on the discussion boards.

== Technology ==
vSide is built on a heavily modified version of the Torque Game Engine based on TGE 1.3.5. Its backend is written in Java, which is connected to MySQL via the Hibernate Java library. vSide was initially built for Windows, the experimental Mac OS X Alpha client was released as of The Music Lounge Beta 6 in November 2006. The buildings were built and lighted with 3D World Studio and GarageGames's Torque Constructor. vSide's DTS objects which are likely smaller objets have been built with Autodesk's 3ds Max. vSide uses cel-shading for rendering.

=== Servers ===
The vSide servers are located in Newark, New Jersey. The world servers (except the Gateway, which has a limit of 25 users per server) have a capacity of each 350 users per server. Its worlds run on 14 servers; if there is heavy demand, servers can be added dynamically.

=== vURLs ===
vSide has its own URI called vURL. It is mostly used for teleporting processes as teleporting to a user or teleporting to a certain spawn point in a public district or apartment, further for music. For both Windows and Mac there is a program called Location Switcher made by vSide users that has the ability to perform simple vURL teleporting actions.

=== External services ===
==== External media services ====
vSide has integrated three external media services. Ever since vSide's release as The Music Lounge, it has had integration with YouTube in the public districts. As apartments were introduced for sale, users were able to watch YouTube videos on screens that come in every apartment in their private spaces. YouTube videos in the main districts can only be controlled by vSide staff and are rarely used. Not all YouTube videos will work in vSide; some videos that have age, country or copyright restrictions will not load in vSide. As of May 2009 embedding SHOUTcast streams into user apartments was established. Links from iTunes' Internet radio can be used for the users' apartment media by copying them to the vSide client via Drag-and-Drop.

==== External social media services ====
AOL Instant Messenger (AIM) is integrated in vSide using the Open AIM API integration since the Music Lounge was released. vSide displays AIM as a second friend list other than the internal friend list of vSide. It features basic chat and a function to invite AIM buddies.

Since the vSide Event Calendar was introduced in 2008, vSiders are able to share their events on Facebook. Users have the ability to post in-game screenshots to a Facebook account directly from the client. This feature was added in addition to sharing buttons on the game's website. As alternative to the manual sharing of pictures introduced in Beta 10, connecting vSide accounts to Facebook was established in March 2010 (vSide Beta 12b). This way, all vSide pictures taken will be posted on the connected user's wall. Other than that, "the ability to easily add vSide events to facebook and invite all your facebook friends" is suggested on the vSide website. Further, vSiders are able to embed Facebook photo links in frames in their apartments.

vSide Tickers, which are messages by vSiders scrolling at the bottom of the application window, can be optionally published via Twitter and Facebook. The tweet will be directly published from the vSide application. vSide events may be published on the vSide website.
