= Boomerang Fu =

2020 video game

- Developer: Cranky Watermelon
- Publisher: Cranky Watermelon
- Designers: Paul Kopetko, Gavin Kusters, David Smith, Teja Godson, Lily Anderson, Rose Hammer
- Artist: Julian Wilton
- Composer: Paul Kopetko
- Engine: Unity
- Platforms: Windows; PlayStation 4 PlayStation 5 Xbox One; Nintendo Switch; Tesla
- Release: Windows, Switch, Xbox One; August 13, 2020; PS4, PS5; January 13, 2022
- Genres: Fighting, party
- Modes: Single-player, multiplayer, Cooperative

Boomerang Fu is a fighting game developed and published by Cranky Watermelon. The game was released for Microsoft Windows, Nintendo Switch, and Xbox One on August 13, 2020. The game released for PlayStation 4 and PlayStation 5 on January 13, 2022. In the game, players control anthropomorphic food-based characters armed with boomerangs and various superpowers. Boomerang Fu received generally favorable reviews.

== Gameplay ==
Avocado uses the Disguise power-up to disguise itself as a pot. When Watermelon walks near the pot, Avocado kills them with a boomerang.

In Boomerang Fu, players control food-themed characters armed with boomerangs. Players can either throw the boomerangs or use them as melee weapons. Thrown boomerangs will fall to the floor if it hits an object. Dropped boomerangs can be recalled by the player. Each character can only be hit once unless the player that got hit has the Shield powerup. The game has over 30 different arenas. To earn a point, the player or players have to be the last one standing or it can be set to earn a point for every kill. It can be played in single-player against AI-controlled opponents. The game also supports local multiplayer, allowing up to six players per match. Characters can die if they fall into water, off a cliff, or leave the arena (depicted by dotted lines) for an extended period of time. If a character dies in one of these ways, other players will not usually earn a point for the kill.

== Powerups ==
Power-ups can be picked up during matches by touching blue books, and provide upgrades for as long as the match lasts. It is possible to alter it so that losing players get the shield power-up. It is also possible to set how fast blue books appear. All power-ups can be stacked except for fire and ice, which cannot stack with each other. Up to three power-ups can be active per player at one time. If a fourth power-up is picked up, a previous power-up will be lost (this does not count single-use power-ups such as Battle Royale or Bamboozled).

Powerups
| Name | Description |
|---|---|
| Caffeinated | Move faster than regular speed and reduces your dash cooldown. |
| Dash through walls | Allow to move through walls while dashing |
| Teleport boomerang | Throw the boomerang and press the dash button to teleport to the first boomerang thrown by you |
| Explosive boomerang | Causes your boomerang to explode after you throw it. The boomerang will automatically appear in your character's hand shortly after exploding. Cancels out if you also have teleport boomerang, and teleport before the explosion occurs. |
| Multi boomerang | When you throw a boomerang, it splits into five boomerangs. You will need to recollect all of the boomerangs to throw again |
| Extra boomerang | Get a second boomerang; the second boomerang is in your character's other hand |
| Fire boomerang | Makes a path of fire wherever it goes. Anyone who touches the fire will become burned, and will eventually die unless they can reach wet ground. It is possible to spread the fire to other players that you come in contact with. |
| Ice boomerang | Makes a path of ice wherever it goes. Anyone who steps on it will slow down and freeze after a while; to get unfrozen, spam dash. But be quick; an opponent could just slash or throw a boomerang on you, or push you against a wall! |
| Disguise | Stand still to change into a nearby object |
| Shield | Get another hit; once you get hit with this powerup, it disappears. |
| Battle royale | Shrinks the dotted line area to where ever the power-up was collected, which makes less space to play |
| Telekinesis | Control your boomerang by holding dash and then using the normal movement controls; but there is a limited radius where this powerup will apply |
| Decoy | Make a fake clone of the same character as whoever collected the decoy powerup. The clone CANNOT use boomerangs |
| Bamboozled | Inverts your controls for a few seconds |
| Drill Boomerang | Lets your boomerang go through walls and objects. The boomerang slows down while doing so. |

== Game modes ==
There are four modes in Boomerang Fu. Only one is available in the demo.

Game modes
| Game Mode | Description | In Demo |
|---|---|---|
| Free for All | Regular kind of game; no teams | Yes |
| Teams | Work together with other people on your team. Points are shared with your team | No |
| Golden Boomerang | Keep the golden boomerang for a few seconds! The golden boomerang makes you slower. | No |
| Hide & Seek | Scramble to find the perfect hiding spot or hunt down your friends. | No |

== Downloadable content ==
There are three DLCs that can be purchased for the game in addition to its normal sale price. The Fresh Flavors Pack released in 2021, the Street Food DLC released in 2026. and the Just Desserts DLC released in 2024 as part of the 1.3.1 update, celebrating 1 million copies sold. Both DLCs are mainly cosmetic, offering skins of different food items, although the Just Desserts DLC adds additional maps.

== Development and release ==
Boomerang Fu was one of 13 ID@Xbox games announced for the Xbox One. It was also one of the 30 games featured at Microsoft's booth at the 2019 Game Developers Conference. The game's release date was announced on July 9, 2020. On August 13, the game was released on Microsoft Windows, Steam, Xbox One, and Nintendo Switch. The game later released on PlayStation 4 and PlayStation 5 on January 13, 2022.

== Reception ==
Reception

Aggregate scores
| Aggregator | Score |
|---|---|
| Metacritic | 78/100 (Note: Score based on 5 reviews.) |
| OpenCritic | 83% recommend |

Review scores
| Publication | Score |
|---|---|
| Gamezebo | 4/5 |
| Nintendo Life | 7/10 |

Boomerang Fu received "generally favorable" reviews according to the review aggregation website Metacritic. Fellow review aggregator OpenCritic assessed that the game received strong approval, being recommended by 83% of critics.

Ollie Reynolds from Nintendo Life rated the game 7/10 stars, praising the premise, gameplay, and power-ups. However, Reynolds criticized the lack of online multiplayer and the few game modes.

Maria Alexander from Gamezebo rated the game 4/5 stars, calling the game's presentation "adorable". However, Alexander was disappointed by the lack of online multiplayer.

=== Awards and nominations ===
Boomerang Fu received the award for Best Gameplay at the 2020 Australian Game Developer Awards. The game was also nominated for Best Sound and Game of the Year, but lost to Audioplay: Alien Strike and Moving Out, respectively. It also received a nomination for Best Sound for Interactive Media at the 2020 Australian Screen Sound Guild Awards.

| Year | Award | Category | Result | Ref |
|---|---|---|---|---|
| 2020 | Australian Game Developer Awards | Best Gameplay | Won | |
| 2020 | Australian Game Developer Awards | Best Sound | Nominated | |
| 2020 | Australian Game Developer Awards | Game of the Year | Nominated | |
| 2020 | Australian Screen Sound Guild Awards | Best Sound for Interactive Media | Nominated | |
