= Beach Buggy Blitz =

2012 racing video game

- Developer: Vector Unit
- Publisher: Vector Unit
- Engine: Vector Engine
- Platforms: Android, iOS, BlackBerry 10
- Release: 2012
- Genre: Racing
- Modes: Single-player, multiplayer

Beach Buggy Blitz is a racing video game developed and published by Vector Unit for Android, iOS and BlackBerry.

== Gameplay ==
Beach Buggy Blitz is built around an "infinite drive" mechanic that challenges players to drive as far as possible. Players can collect coins along the way to upgrade or paint their car, unlock new vehicles and drivers, and customize the game itself with new powerups and consumables.

== Reception ==
Reception

Aggregate score
Aggregator	Score
Metacritic	80/100

Review scores
Publication	Score
Gamezebo	80/100
Pocket Gamer	3.5/5
Vandal	7.9/10
148Apps	4/5

Beach Buggy Blitz received "generally favorable" reviews according to review aggregator Metacritic.

Gamezebo gave the Android version a rave review, saying that "Beach Buggy Blitz is one of the best titles Android has to offer," and 148Apps said "Beach Buggy Blitz is fantastic and one of the best of its kind on iOS. An absolute pleasure to play and play again."

== Sequels ==
The game has received two sequels; Beach Buggy Racing which first released in 2014, and Beach Buggy Racing 2 which first released in 2018. Both titles are free, with the exception of their home console releases which must be paid for, originally the home console version of Beach Buggy Racing 2 entitled Beach Buggy Racing 2: Island Adventure was set to release in 2020, however due to the COVID-19 pandemic, the title would be delayed to the first quarter of 2021 as stated in Vector Unit's website, the title was released on 10 March 2021. Beach Buggy Racing 2 is playable on Tesla vehicles.

== See also ==
- Mario Kart
- Crash Team Racing
- Team Sonic Racing
