= Summer of Arcade =

Annual feature on Xbox Live Arcade

The Summer of Arcade, known as Winter of Arcade in the southern hemisphere, was an annual feature on Xbox Live Arcade that offered video game titles. As of 2013, the feature finished its sixth year.

== 2008 ==
- Bionic Commando Rearmed
- Braid
- Castle Crashers
- Galaga Legions
- Geometry Wars: Retro Evolved 2

== 2009 ==
- Marvel vs. Capcom 2: New Age of Heroes
- Shadow Complex
- 'Splosion Man
- Teenage Mutant Ninja Turtles: Turtles in Time Re-Shelled
- Trials HD

== 2010 ==
- Castlevania: Harmony of Despair
- Hydro Thunder Hurricane
- Lara Croft and the Guardian of Light
- LIMBO
- Monday Night Combat

== 2011 ==
- Bastion
- From Dust
- Fruit Ninja Kinect
- Insanely Twisted Shadow Planet
- Toy Soldiers: Cold War

== 2012 ==
- Deadlight
- Dust: An Elysian Tail
- Hybrid
- Tony Hawk's Pro Skater HD
- Wreckateer

== 2013 ==
- Teenage Mutant Ninja Turtles: Out of the Shadows
- Flashback
- Brothers: A Tale of Two Sons
- Charlie Murder
