= Behemoth (video game) =

2024 video game

- Developer: The Behemoth
- Publisher: The Behemoth
- Platform: Windows
- Release: WW: October 31, 2024
- Genre: Endless runner
- Mode: Single-player

Behemoth (styled as BEHEMOTH) is a side-scrolling "dodge and flap" endless runner video game developed by San Diego-based indie studio The Behemoth. It was released for Windows in October 2024.

== Gameplay ==
Here is a gameplay footage showing the chicken flapping.

The game is described as "an arcade extravaganza in which you play as a chicken gathering up baby chicks and collecting candy corn as you soar through the skies". Candy corn is used to unlock in-game cosmetics "like chicken colors, beaks, wattles, and feet". The game also features daily leaderboards on which players can compete. Gaming journalists made note of its resemblance to the 2013 mobile game Flappy Bird, although the core gameplay concepts differ.

== Development ==
John Baez, co-founder of the studio, stated, "In 2003, it starred in a little minigame on our first website. Visitors were prompted to lift The Behemoth chicken out of its nest and gently maneuver it to one of the roosts on the other side of the screen. If you didn't succeed, the chicken would scream as it fell off the bottom of the screen. Luckily it would reappear back in the nest, ready for another try! Now, twenty-one years later we are happy to make the iconic chicken the star of its own arcade game! Save some baby chicks! Save the world! Have some fun!".

== Reception ==
Behemoth received a mostly positive reception from critics and fans.
