= Alien Hominid =

2004 video game

- North American cover art
- Developer: The Behemoth (Note: Ported to Game Boy Advance and J2ME by Tuna Technologies)
- Publisher: The Behemoth (Note: The PlayStation 2, GameCube, Xbox, and Game Boy Advance versions were published by Zoo Digital Publishing in Europe and O3 Entertainment in North America.)
- Producer: John Baez
- Designer: Tom Fulp
- Programmer: Tom Fulp
- Artist: Dan Paladin
- Composer: Matthew E. Harwood (Note: Adobe Flash music composed by Lavender Hill Mob. Game Boy Advance music composed by Allister Brimble and Anthony N. Putson)
- Platforms: Adobe Flash: PlayStation 2; GameCube; J2ME; Xbox; Game Boy Advance; Xbox 360; Nintendo Switch; Windows; Xbox One; Xbox Series X/S; PlayStation 4; PlayStation 5
- Release: August 7, 2002: Adobe Flash; WW: August 7, 2002; PlayStation 2; NA: November 21, 2004; EU: May 27, 2005; GameCube; NA: November 23, 2004; J2ME; EU: May 23, 2005; Xbox; EU: May 27, 2005; AU: June 23, 2005; Game Boy Advance; EU: February 3, 2006; AU: February 9, 2006; Xbox 360; WW: February 28, 2007; NS, Win, XBO, XSX/S; WW: November 1, 2023; PS4, PS5; WW: June 10, 2025
- Genre: Run and gun
- Modes: Single-player, multiplayer

Alien Hominid is a run and gun video game developed by The Behemoth and first released as a Flash game on the multimedia website Newgrounds on August 7, 2002. It was originally developed in Adobe Flash by programmer and Newgrounds founder, Tom Fulp, and animator and artist, Dan Paladin. An expanded console version was released on the PlayStation 2, GameCube and Xbox across 2004 and 2005. A port for the Game Boy Advance, developed by Tuna Technologies, was released in 2006 for PAL regions. A high-definition version titled Alien Hominid HD was released for the Xbox 360 via Xbox Live Arcade in 2007. Another remaster, Alien Hominid HD, was released for Windows, Nintendo Switch, Xbox One and Xbox Series X/S alongside its sequel, Alien Hominid Invasion, in 2023, and again in 2025 for the PlayStation 4 and PlayStation 5.

== Gameplay ==
A gameplay screenshot of the HD version demonstrating the second boss fight of 1-1 showing Alien Hominid fighting Installball

Alien Hominid is a side-scrolling run and gun shooter in a similar vein to games such as Metal Slug, where one hit instantly kills and has a two-player simultaneous play. Players take over as the titular hominid, who has to fend off waves of secret agents. His main arsenal is a blaster, while players can also melee close-up enemies and use a limited number of grenades to attack. Advanced moves include rolling under shots, jumping on and biting off enemies' heads, temporarily scaring other enemies, and digging underground to drag enemies down with them.

Players can collect a numerous variety of power-ups which simultaneously give players extra grenades, a shield, and unique ammo. Players can also drive vehicles, ride on top of a yeti, and pilot a UFO. Completing certain tasks will unlock hats the players can dress their Hominid in. The main game features sixteen stages.

Outside of the main game, there are three multiplayer modes (Challenge, Neutron Ball, and Pinata Boss), a PDA game (featuring around 200 levels and a level editor), an extra mode called All You Can Eat, and a retro minigame, Super Soviet Missile Mastar.

== Plot ==
The Alien Hominid that the game follows is flying over Earth when the FBI intercept its spacecraft, sending it crashing down to the planet. While the alien lies unconscious from the crash, FBI agents promptly steal its ship, causing it to go after the FBI to get the ship back, with the help of young citizens of the city, known in the game as "fat kids". Upon retrieving the ship, the alien flies right into a Soviet missile that was traveling towards America, detonating it and sending the alien crashing down into Russia. The alien then retrieves the ship a second time, before being captured by an Area 51 spaceship. While being transported in a cage by an Area 51 agent across the desert, a bump in the road causes the cage to fall out from behind and break, freeing the alien. During the alien's third search for his ship, he befriends a sentient eyeball that piloted robots the alien fought previously. While the eyeball helps the alien, a similar-looking buff alien fights the alien as the agents cheer it on. After defeating the buff alien, the "fat kids" seize an Area 51 truck, place the alien and eyeball back in the alien's ship, set it to take off, and begin to drive away. With the Area 51 agents on the kids' tail, the alien places a tractor beam over the kids, lifting them out of the truck.

== Development and release ==
Development started in 2002 when artist Dan Paladin created the alien character and approached Newgrounds founder Tom Fulp to discuss making a web game. They decided to make a run and gun game inspired by Metal Slug, Contra, and Gunstar Heroes. Alien Hominid was released for Adobe Flash on Newgrounds in August 2002. Its success prompted Fulp, Paladin, John Baez, and Brandon LaCava to form The Behemoth to develop an expanded console version. They experimented with using 3D rendered versions of the characters at first, but scrapped the idea as "it was totally lacking the charm and character of the original." The console version took 18 months to develop with a full-time team of 8 people and a budget of $1.3 million, funded by merchandise sales. The Behemoth pitched it to 40 publishers, who doubted the game's commercial viability and rejected it. Baez set up a display at the first US Game Connection in 2004. The feedback led to publisher negotiations and meetings with European publishers. Alien Hominid was released for the PlayStation 2 and GameCube in November 2004, with the J2ME and Xbox following in May 2005 and the Game Boy Advance version in February 2006.

== Reception ==
Reception

Aggregate scores
Aggregator	Score				
Aggregator	GBA	GameCube	PS2	Xbox	Xbox 360
GameRankings	88%	82%	81%	76%	78%
Metacritic	N/A	78/100	78/100	76/100	79/100

Review scores
Publication	Score				
Publication	GBA	GameCube	PS2	Xbox	Xbox 360
Edge	N/A	N/A	7/10	N/A	N/A
Electronic Gaming Monthly	N/A	7.83/10	7.83/10	N/A	N/A
Eurogamer	N/A	N/A	N/A	6/10	8/10
Game Informer	N/A	8/10	8/10	N/A	N/A
GamePro	N/A	3.5/5	3.5/5	N/A	N/A
GameRevolution	N/A	3/5	B−	N/A	N/A
GameSpot	N/A	8.4/10	8.4/10	N/A	8.5/10
GameSpy	N/A	N/A	3.5/5	N/A	N/A
GameTrailers	N/A	7.8/10	7.8/10	N/A	N/A
GameZone	N/A	8.5/10	8/10	N/A	N/A
IGN	N/A	8.1/10	8.1/10	N/A	8.5/10
Nintendo Power	N/A	3.5/5	N/A	N/A	N/A
Official U.S. PlayStation Magazine	N/A	N/A	4/5	N/A	N/A
Official Xbox Magazine (US)	N/A	N/A	N/A	N/A	7.5/10
Detroit Free Press	N/A	N/A	3/4	N/A	N/A
The Times	N/A	N/A	4/5	4/5	N/A

The game received "generally favorable reviews" on all platforms according to the review aggregation website Metacritic. It was nominated for GameSpot's annual "Funniest Game" award, which went to Grand Theft Auto: San Andreas.

Before its release, Alien Hominid received notice in gaming magazines such as Play, GMR, Edge, Dragon, and mainstream magazines such as Wired. In reviews, it was acclaimed for its old-school style gameplay, tough difficulty, and humor. The game won many small awards, most notably at the Independent Games Festival (for Innovation In Visual Arts, Technical Excellence and the Audience Award).

== Legacy ==
Hominid appears during one of the levels in The Behemoth's second game, Castle Crashers, using a lance weapon based on his ray gun. It is playable to anyone who has also downloaded Alien Hominid HD on the Xbox 360 version, while he is unlocked by completing said level on the PlayStation Network and Steam versions of the game. The green eyeball from an early boss fight also appears as an Animal Orb, firing lasers at enemies. Hominid appears as a playable character in Team Meat's Super Meat Boy, another game that originated as a flash game on Newgrounds. The Super Soviet Missile Mastar minigame from Alien Hominid was released as a free app for iOS on February 7, 2011. An improved version of the PDA Games minigame was released for iOS on December 9, 2011. Developer Tom Fulp has cited the PDA Games as being the inspiration for The Behemoth's third game, BattleBlock Theater, which features unlockable Hominid character heads for those who own Alien Hominid HD.

On January 30, 2020, The Behemoth announced their fifth game, Alien Hominid Invasion, which they describe as "an all-new re-imagination" of the original game featuring new gameplay and mechanics. It was released on November 1, 2023. A remaster of the original game, Alien Hominid HD, was released alongside Invasion for Xbox One, Xbox Series X/S, Nintendo Switch and PC.
