= Pico's School =

1999 Flash game

- Developer: Tom Fulp
- Publishers: Tom Fulp, via Newgrounds
- Programmer: Tom Fulp
- Composer: ThatJohnnyGuy (2016 version)
- Series: Pico
- Engine: Adobe Flash
- Platform: Browser
- Release: July 25, 1999
- Genre: Point-and-click adventure
- Mode: Single-player

Pico's School is a 1999 point-and-click Flash game developed by Tom Fulp for his website Newgrounds. At the time of its release, it was "one of the most sophisticated" browser games, exhibiting "a complexity of design and polish in presentation that [was] virtually unseen in amateur Flash game development". It has been widely credited with kickstarting the Flash games scene and helping launch Newgrounds "as a public force".

The game was inspired by the Columbine High School massacre, and was released only three months after the event. It centers around the titular Pico, a young boy who must fight a group of stereotypical goth kids who have killed his classmates.

== Plot ==
During a school lesson, Pico's classmate Cassandra interrupts the class to denounce the American education system, which she believes to be "bullshit", before opening fire upon her fellow students. Pico blacks out during the chaos, managing to escape the classroom only to discover the majority of his classmates have been killed. As Pico fights the goth kids, he discovers they are being manipulated by Cassandra. Cassandra is then revealed to be an alien, and Pico must defeat her.

== Gameplay ==
The game lets players choose multiple pathways throughout the school's halls, have conversations with surviving students, and engage in enemy fights, all driven by mouse clicks.

== Development ==
Tom Fulp stated in an interview that he was inspired to make the game following a variety of angry e-mails sent to his website Newgrounds following the Columbine massacre, many of which would blame internet websites for distributing offensive content. The game was developed in Macromedia Flash 3 prior to the advent of the scripting language ActionScript, which almost all subsequent Flash games would use. To simulate stored data, Fulp claims to have created a complex web of movie clips to simulate in-game variables, an innovative technique which created a considerable strain during highly interactive sequences, such as boss fights.

The game was released in 1999 on Newgrounds, with an update released in 2006. On April Fools' Day 2021, the original Pico's School was replaced by Pico's School: Love Conquers All, a re-telling of the story in which the massacre never happens.

== Reception and legacy ==
An article published by Spin referred to the game as the work of a "sick genius". Andrew Lerner of Troma Entertainment commented that when he first saw the game, he laughed so hard he almost wet his pants. Troma Entertainment were reportedly at one point in talks with Tom Fulp about making a movie based on the game. A contemporary write-up of Newgrounds on the Japanese tech site Internet Watch by Mie Aoki recommended the game and called it a good way to test how stuck your mind is in elementary school. In a 2020 article, Wired called the game "irreverent pulp".

Tom Fulp, the game's creator, has referred to Pico's School as a "real defining moment for Newgrounds". The game was "hailed by many as the pinnacle of Flash ... 'programming'" and is said to have "offered a first model for the type of point-and-click interactivity that would become a standard". The titular Pico would go on to become essential iconography for Newgrounds, being featured in a number of games and animations. (Note: Attributed to multiple sources:) By 2014, the game had received over 6 million views on Newgrounds.

=== Canceled sequel ===
A sequel with the working title Pico 2 was under development for a number of years since August 1999, but was canceled in the 2010s. Two prototype versions were made available to supporters of Newgrounds in 2016. The Kickstarter for the popular rhythm game Friday Night Funkin' (which features Pico as a recurring character) promised to finish and release Pico 2 should its Kickstarter reach $5 million in funding, though this goal was ultimately not achieved.
