= Pit People =

2018 video game

- Developer: The Behemoth
- Publisher: The Behemoth
- Platforms: Windows; Xbox One
- Release: March 2, 2018
- Genres: Tactical role-playing, strategy
- Modes: Single-player, multiplayer

Pit People is a tactical role-playing game by indie game developer The Behemoth. An early access version for Microsoft Windows and Xbox One was released in January 2017 and the full version was released in March 2018.

== Gameplay ==
In-game screenshot of a team battling another team

Pit People is a turn-based strategy game inspired by classic JRPGs. Players build parties to fight enemies they encounter in the overworld and story missions. The battles take place in hexagonal arenas, where characters have a limited range of motion per turn. All player actions in the game are related to distance. Obstacles are present within the arenas to add another layer of strategy in party placement.

Parties can be any combination of customized units. The player selects a single character as the "leader" and receives buffs accordingly. Equipment can be given to units that modify their attack abilities, including range and movement options. Random encounters and story missions net the player loot for their party, ranging from weapons, equipment, and cosmetics. Certain characters are able to trap enemies and recruit them to your party pool, a necessary gameplay loop for growing your parties' abilities.

== Development ==
The Behemoth, founded in 2003 and based in San Diego, California, is known for making games with offbeat humor and a signature cartoon art style. The success of their prior games—Alien Hominid, Castle Crashers, and BattleBlock Theater—established their reputation as an indie game developer. As BattleBlock Theater approached its April 2013 release, the company began work on Pit People under the codename "Game 4" (the studio's fourth game). The new game was designed to continue its predecessor's story, and both prominently feature a "space bear". Its original arena-centered concept was titled "Pit People". Behemoth set out to make a team-based game, and developed its strategy gameplay elements over time—the grid-based combat was raised several months into development. This was a new genre for the company, which had established itself with action games. By 2014, the game had become a "fast-paced, turn-based, co-op adventure with management and role-playing game elements" in development for Xbox One and Steam. While the genre was new for the developer, the game retained their signature style. The team teased its reveal in August 2014, when it debuted as a playable demo at the PAX Prime exposition. They released its first trailer a year later, and ran a private beta test in September 2016. Steam Early Access and Xbox One Game Preview program versions were launched on January 13, 2017. In a blog post, The Behemoth announced that they are aiming to release the game in the first few months of 2018. On February 21, it was announced that the game would release March 2.

== Reception ==
Reception

Aggregate score
Aggregator	Score
Metacritic	PC: 78/100; XONE: 79/100

In an early 2015 preview, Polygon wrote that the game's control scheme appeared to balance accessibility for newcomers and tactical options for veterans. They added that it was the funniest title at the PAX East expo. PC Gamer noted the game's zaniness and the enjoyment of playing it. GameSpot described its gameplay and style as "chaotic" and "unabashedly lowbrow", in light of an objective based on destroying fecal matter. The game received positive reviews upon release according to review aggregator Metacritic. It was nominated for "Writing in a Comedy" at the National Academy of Video Game Trade Reviewers Awards.
