= Alien Hominid Invasion =

2023 video game

- Developer: The Behemoth
- Publisher: The Behemoth
- Designer: Dan Paladin
- Composer: Patric Catani
- Platforms: Windows; Xbox One; Xbox Series X/S; Nintendo Switch; PlayStation 4; PlayStation 5
- Release: Windows, Switch, Xbox One, Series X/S; November 1, 2023; PS4, PS5; June 10, 2025
- Genres: Run and gun Roguelike
- Modes: Single-player, multiplayer

Alien Hominid Invasion is a 2023 run and gun video game developed by The Behemoth. It serves as a sequel/reimagining of The Behemoth's 2004 video game Alien Hominid, originally released as a demo on Newgrounds on August 7, 2002.

== Gameplay ==
A gameplay screenshot showing the players shooting enemies and running and dodging

Alien Hominid Invasion is a side-scrolling roguelike shooter with exp leveling and loot mechanics. Players must navigate an overworld map completing objectives and destroying city blocks until they progress to a headquarters where they can defeat a boss to extract earned loot. Different paths can be chosen to avoid hazards and find hideouts that contain items and loot storage.

The game features four-player online or local co-op.

== Development ==
The Behemoth announced Alien Hominid Invasion as Game 5 in January 2020. During development, The Behemoth regularly live-streamed development updates/diaries and held a closed beta.

In July 2024, The Behemoth announced a PS4/PS5 release, along with additional updates.

== Release and Reception ==
The game launched on November 1, 2023, for PC, Nintendo Switch, Xbox One, and Xbox Series consoles. Invasion launched alongside Alien Hominid HD. The Behemoth offered a bundle of both games at launch.

NintendoLife awarded the game a 7/10, criticizing the mission structure and randomness of objectives.
