= Newgrounds =

American entertainment website

- Logo since 2018
- Company type: Private
- Website type: Entertainment
- Available in: English
- Founded: July 6, 1995; 31 years ago
- Headquarters: 323 W Glenside Ave, Glenside, Pennsylvania, U.S.
- Area served: Worldwide (except Indonesia and North Korea)
- Founder: Tom Fulp
- Key people: Tom Fulp (founder, CEO); Josh Tuttle (site programmer); James Holloway (site programmer); Jeff Bandelin (artist, animator)
- Services: Video games; animation; art; music; user-generated content; hosting service
- Parent: Newgrounds.com, Inc.
- Website: newgrounds.com
- Registration: Optional (Note: Required to vote on, review, comment on, earn medals for points on games, submit content, and view adult content)

Newgrounds is an American entertainment website founded by Tom Fulp in 1995 and owned by Newgrounds.com, Inc. The site hosts user-generated content such as interactive games, films, audio, and artwork. Fulp produces in-house content at the headquarters and offices in Glenside, Pennsylvania, a suburb of Philadelphia.

In the 2000s, Newgrounds played an important role in Internet culture, and in Internet animation and independent video gaming in particular. It has been called a "distinct time in gaming history", a place "where many animators and developers cut their teeth and gained a following long before social media was even a thing", and "a haven for fostering the greats of internet animation".

== Content ==
The Newgrounds logo used from 2006 to 2018 with Tankman, the Newgrounds mascot. This logo and similar ones can be seen at the start of Flash games and videos on the website.

User-generated content can be uploaded and categorized into one of the site's four web portals: Games, Movies, Audio, and Art. A Movie or Games submission undergoes the process termed "judgement", where it can be rated by one user (from 0 to 5 stars) and reviewed by other users. The average score calculated at various points during judgment determines if whether the content will be "saved" (added onto the database) or "blammed" (deleted with only its reviews saved in the "Obituaries" section).

Since Adobe Flash Player was shut down on most browsers by late 2020, Newgrounds uses the Ruffle emulator, an Adobe Flash emulator written in Rust and sponsored by Newgrounds along with other popular sites like Cool Math Games and Armor Games. In 2022, Ruffle supported most Flash content written in ActionScript 1.0 and 2.0, and only a select few Flashes written in 3.0, which meant to play then unsupported content, users had to use the "Newgrounds Player", the site's previous downloadable Flash end-of-life solution which it used prior to Ruffle for playing content.

Art and Audio are processed using a different method called "scouting", which the site describes as "a way to vet users and weed out spam, stolen works, low quality submissions, etc." All users can put art and audio onto their own page, but only those that are "scouted" will appear in the public area. Like the judgment system, it stops stolen content, spam, or prohibited material reaching the public area, relying on users and site moderators. Once an individual is scouted, they are given the privilege to scout others, though users caught scouting other users who regularly break the site's terms of service and/or guidelines ("abusing the system") get unscouted themselves.

Content and context are liable to be reported for review to the moderators and staff members by flagging it for violations to the site's guidelines. A weighted system recognizes experienced users and gives their flag more voice. Newgrounds' homepage includes featured submissions from each category, as well as awards and honors to users whose submission that fall under the site's requirements to earn them. Members of Newgrounds also organize animations called "collabs" through the discussion forum on the site. Some scholars noted that while hundreds of these "collabs" are produced every year, only 20% are completed due to stress on those making the animations, while other scholars said that animators maintain a "strong sense" of authorship and ownership of what they produce, especially solo animators.

Matt Jolly, known by his internet alias Krinkels, has been posting violent Madness Combat cartoons to Newgrounds since 2001. On the annual "Madness Day", users upload their own animated content inspired by Jolly's series, and Jolly selects his favorites during his YouTube streams. He describes the day as "like a second Christmas" for him.

== History ==
=== Origins and early years (1990s–2000s) ===
In 1991, at the age of 13, Tom Fulp launched a Neo Geo fanzine called New Ground and sent issues to approximately 100 members of a club originating on the online service Prodigy. Using a hosting service, he launched a website called New Ground Remix in 1995, which increased in popularity during the summer of 1996 after Fulp created the BBS games Club a Seal and Assassin while a student at Drexel University. He then created Club a Seal II and Assassin II, along with a separate hosting site titled New Ground Atomix. The 1999 release of Pico's School, a Flash browser game that "exhibited a complexity of design and polish in presentation that was virtually unseen in amateur Flash game development" of the time, helped establish Newgrounds as a "public force."

1999 also saw the consolidation of both sites into one domain name (newgrounds.com), and the creation of "The Portal", a place on the site for Fulp to put his Flash projects that were smaller and more unfinished. Site visitors began to reach out through email with their own Flash content, which was showcased on a webpage in The Portal. By 2000, there were so many Portal submissions that submitting Flash content to the Portal would become an automated process with the help of Fulp's friend Ross. Tom has stated that the automated Portal "ultimately defined [Newgrounds]'s purpose".

While Macromedia Flash Player was required for Newgrounds in order to play games, the site also brought together members who were interested in producing Flash games and gained "considerable online influence" as a result. It subsequently became one of the most "active Flash creator communities in the English-speaking Internet" and served as a place that video game developers could begin their careers. Flash was once described by Newgrounds as the "driving force" behind the site. Even so, those on the site had a "low tolerance for poor quality work", referring mainly to humor and storytelling instead of animation quality. Some animators on the site moved to YouTube by the mid-2000s. By November 2008, Newgrounds had over 1.5 million users and over 130,000 animations. This had increased by August 2010, when it was reported that the site had over 2.2 million users and over 180,000 games and animated films, most of which were animations made by only one person, with others collaboratively made by various individuals. It was also said in 2013 that users had created "hundreds of thousands of animated movies and online games".

=== Recent history (2010s–present) ===
Time ranked the website at No. 39 on its list of "50 Best Websites" in 2010.

On the 25th of October 2011, the animation "[S]: Cascade", the end of Act 5 of the widely popular webcomic Homestuck, crashed the website, despite being mainly hosted on its own website mspa.com (which it crashed too), and, allegedly, crashing Tumblr (as the webcomic's fanbase was mainly there by then) and megaupload (from people uploading mirrors to the animation).

In 2018, Newgrounds began to encourage contributors to submit their games in an HTML5 format rather than Flash. In November and December, it experienced surges of new members originally from Tumblr when that site began restricting adult content after illegal child pornography was found on it, resulting in the Tumblr iOS app being removed from the App Store. In the summer of 2019, with the discontinuation of Flash upcoming, the administration of Newgrounds unveiled the Newgrounds Player for Windows, which was described as a "solution for playing Flash games and movies" hosted on the site. The application would launch via the website upon a request to view Flash content and play it. The player would later be followed up with the Ruffle Flash emulator in August 2019, with the two options being offered in tandem as development on Ruffle progressed.

In April 2021, an update for the browser game Friday Night Funkin' was exclusively released on Newgrounds at the time, causing the site's server to become overloaded after an influx of site traffic. In July, Fulp received the Game Developers Choice Awards Pioneer Award for his contributions to establishing Newgrounds and subsequent work in The Behemoth. In September 2023, an update to the site's Art Portal was rolled out, implementing it in the existing Project system for animation, games and audio, as well as adding the ability to use multi-author credits on Art submissions and adding multi-art support in either Inline, Strip or Gallery formats.

In March 2024, the site's reporting system was updated to enable users to report content predominantly generated by artificial intelligence (AI). On October 8, Takeover Tuesday was introduced, where every Tuesday, paid Newgrounds supporters could post content to the front page. On May 12, 2025, controller mapping for Flash games was introduced, allowing for controller support to be introduced to Flash games which originally lacked it.

== Controversies ==
=== V-Tech Rampage ===
On May 12, 2007, Australian developer Ryan Jake Lambourn, known online as PIGPEN, released a Flash game titled V-Tech Rampage to the website. The game was a recreation of the Virginia Tech shooting and was uploaded less than a month after the incident occurred. Many criticized the game for its lack of respect for the tragedy and its script being riddled with various grammatical errors, racial slurs, and various other obscenities. In response to the backlash his game had caused, Lambourn would put up a post on his website claiming he would remove the game from both Newgrounds and his own personal site as well as apologize if certain donation goals were met. This statement was later withdrawn, with Lambourn claiming that the donation incentives was a joke. V-tech Rampage was often compared to a similar game, Super Columbine Massacre RPG!. The creator of the game, Danny Ledonne, left a comment on Lambourn's website in response saying, "I would like to ask bloggers to consider not whether a game about the Virginia Tech shooting SHOULD be made but how we might go about making a game that accomplishes more than [V-Tech Rampage] does with the subject matter."

=== The Torture Game 2 ===
On May 11, 2007, a user known as Cmann uploaded The Torture Game 2 to Newgrounds, a sequel to the torture game which was released the year prior. The physics-based sandbox game had no defined objectives, allowing players to manipulate and torture an androgynous human figure. Although it initially received little attention, the game gained significant popularity after being featured on Newgrounds' front page on June 26, 2008. Due to its sudden surge in popularity and the graphic and morbid content of the game, NBC News and Fox News made their own coverage of the story. The NBC News article, penned by Winda Benedetti, understood the "Because I could" aspect of the game that resonated with certain people and pointed out how many insisted that the game was "a great stress reliever". The Fox News broadcast discussing the game took a more negative stance against the game, pointing out the graphic nature of the game and its potential effects on children.

The publicity led to a surge in the game's visibility. In a 2008 Newgrounds post, site founder Tom Fulp remarked on the irony of the situation, stating, "...But the real fun came when FOX News weighed in with a Fair & Balanced video, expressing their disgust while showing real-time footage of the person being tortured. Hey! At least we slapped a MATURE rating on the game and made you click a link to view it [...] Fox just dumped it into every living room in America."

=== The Slaying of Sandy Hook Elementary ===
In 2013, Lambourn released another game inspired by a real-life shooting, titled The Slaying of Sandy Hook Elementary. Released shortly before the first anniversary of the Sandy Hook Elementary School shooting, the game recreated the events of the incident from the perspective of the perpetrator, Adam Lanza. Unlike his previous work V-Tech Rampage, the game attempts to have more of a point to make. After beating the game, the player is awarded with an alternate "Gun Control Mode", replacing the gun the assailant uses with a katana. In the audio commentary that plays over the game's credits, Lambourn recounts his own experiences with gun control and how different the approaches are between Australia and his time growing up in Houston, Texas. The game also provides links to where people could educate themselves and reach out to lawmakers in order for stricter gun laws to be instated, with Lambourn stating, "As much as you might want to blame this entire state of affairs on politicians, or the National Rifle Association (NRA), you have to remember that your representatives aren't mind readers, and the NRA is not doing anything more than motivating its members to passionately talk to those representatives about their opinions," he said. "If you're a middle of the road person who believes firearms should at least have the same amount of safety regulations as a car, then it's really on you, because your absolute apathy is why the news is unbearable to watch."

Shortly after release, Lambourn engaged in an argument with one of the victim's family members, Donna Soto. In response, she said "We're coming up on December. My daughter's birthday just passed. It just adds insult to the suffering that we're dealing with. It's just incomprehensible that someone would think this kind of thing is wanted." The game was later removed from Newgrounds, a decision that Tom Fulp said he did not take lightly. On November 18, 2013, Fulp made a Newgrounds post titled "Censorship", where he discussed the difficulty he faced when coming to a decision regarding the removal of the game, stating "Newgrounds has faced harsh criticism in the past for standing firm on not censoring distasteful material, namely games about school shootings. All I can say is that this game took things to a new level in terms of the age of the victims and the realism of the terror they faced on that day. I was personally contacted by Sandy Hook parents and they expressed their understanding of what the game was attempting to communicate, but also expressed the sadness and horror it made them feel, and their desire to have it removed. Today I'm choosing respect for the Sandy Hook parents over respect for NG's censorship policies. Either decision on this matter puts a knot in my stomach."

== See also ==
- Internet art
- History of the Internet
- List of video game websites
- Independent animation
