= Concept art =

Special type of art that conceptualizes a subject

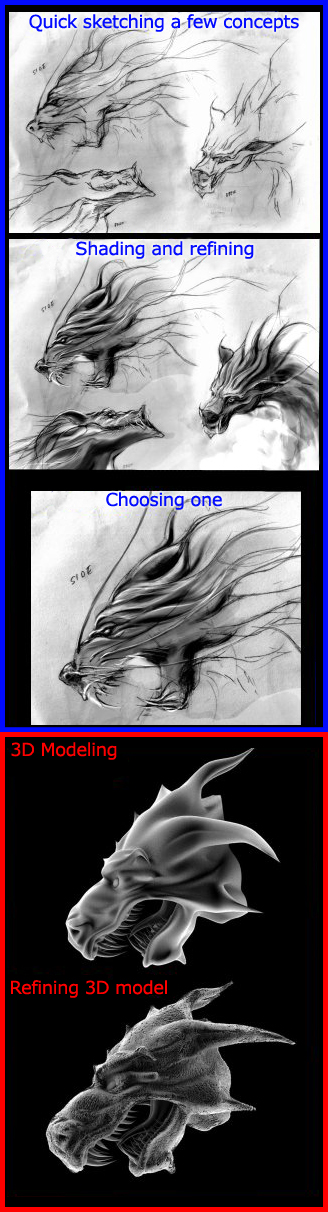
Example of concept design workflow (blue) followed by 3D modeling (red). Reference and inspiration for 3D modeling is a common use of concept art.

Concept art is a form of visual art used to convey an idea for use in film, video games, animation, comic books, television shows, or other media before it is put into the final product. The term was used by the Walt Disney Animation Studios as early as the 1930s. Concept art usually refers to world-building artwork used to inspire the development of media products, and is not the same as storyboard, though they are often confused.

Concept art is developed through several iterations. Multiple solutions are explored before settling on the final design. Concept art is not only used to develop the work but also to show the project's progress to directors, clients, and investors. Once the development of the work is complete, concept art may be reworked and used for advertising materials.

== Overview of the industry ==
A concept artist is an individual who generates a visual design for an item, character, or area that does not yet exist. This includes, but is not limited to, film, animation, and more recently, video game production. Being a concept artist takes commitment, vision, and a clear understanding of the role.

While it is necessary to have the skills of a fine artist, a concept artist must also be able to work under strict deadlines in the capacity of a graphic designer. Some concept artists may start as fine artists, industrial designers, animators, or even special effects artists. Interpretation of ideas and how they are realized is where the concept artist's individual creativity is most evident, but subject matter is often beyond their control. Many concept artists work in a studio or from home remotely as freelancers. Working for a studio has the advantage of an established salary. In the United States, the average annual gross salary for a concept artist in video game industry was $60,000-$70,000 a year in 2017. In 2024, entry level concept art positions ranged from $60,000-$95,000, with the average salary at about $112,000.

Digital media production, including the television and video game industries, has grown substantially in the 21st century. From 2009 to 2012, the value of the United States video game industry jumped from $19 million to $37 billion, and from 2008 to 2016, the value of the mobile game industry in China increased from 240 million yuan to 37.48 billion yuan. The need for concept artists in this rapidly growing industry has skyrocketed; 65% of the game development industry's staff are artists. As such, there is a push for countries across the world to increase the availability of art education so that local artists have the skills to capitalize on the booming media industry. The art education community has made changes, offering new courses in art universities order better prepare students for the digital art field. Certain educators are pushing to move away from historic art education towards more standardized, industry-paced approaches that will better prepare students for this modern workforce. Other programs are pushing to create artist workshops in order to train artists in digital software.

== Materials ==
Concept art has embraced the use of digital technology. Raster graphics editors for digital painting have become more easily available, as well as hardware such as graphics tablets, enabling more efficient working methods. Prior to this, any number of traditional media such as oil paints, acrylic paints, markers and pencils were used. Many modern paint packages are programmed to simulate the blending of color in the same way paint would blend on a canvas; proficiency with traditional media is often paramount to a concept artist's ability to use painting software. Popular programs for concept artists include Photoshop and Corel Painter. Others include Clip Studio Paint (previously Manga Studio), Procreate and ArtRage. Most concept artists have switched to digital media because of the ease of editing and speed. A lot of concept work has tight deadlines where a highly polished piece is needed in a short amount of time.

== Themes and styles ==
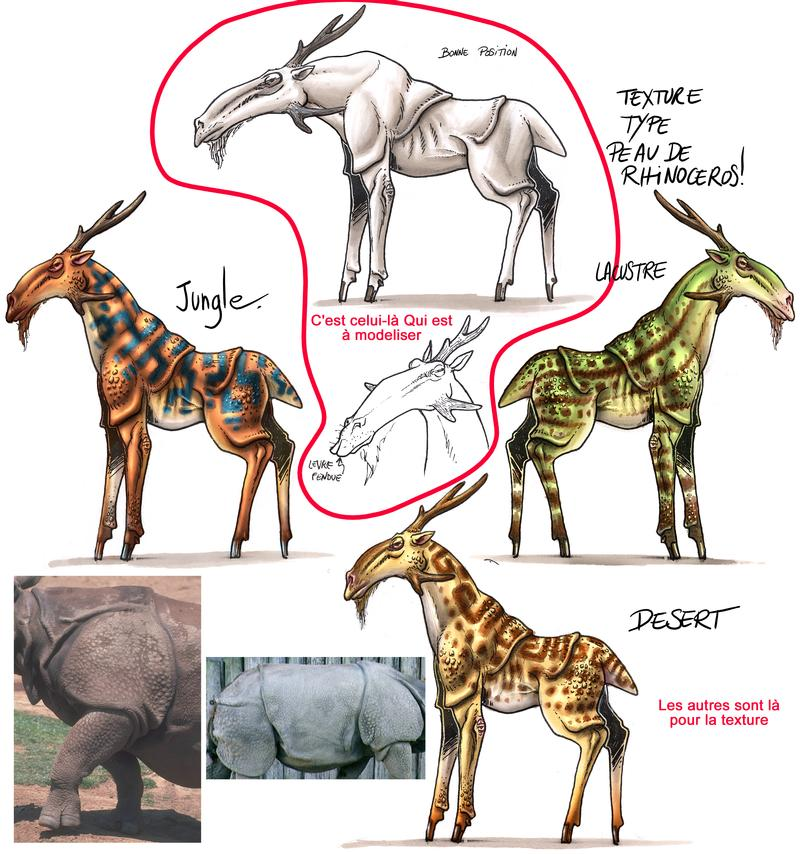
Concept artists are expected to draw many iterations of the same concept. Often, they may reference real-world objects.

Concept art has always had to cover many subjects, being the primary medium in film poster design since the early days of Hollywood, but the two most widely covered areas are science fiction and fantasy. Since the recent rise of its use in video game production, concept art has expanded to cover genres from fantasy to realistic depending on the final product.

Concept art ranges from stylized to photorealistic depending on the needs of the project. Artists working on a project often produce a large turnover in the early "blue sky" stage of production. This provides a broad range of interpretations, most being in the form of sketches, speed paints, and 3D overpaints. Later pieces, such as matte paintings, are produced as realistically as required. Concept artists will often have to adapt to the style of the studio they are hired for. The ability to produce multiple styles is valued in a concept artist.

== See also ==
- Key art
- Illustration
- 3D modeling
- Architectural rendering
- Artist's impression
- Matte painting
- Storyboard
- Concept car
- Digital painting
