= Digital painting =

Type of art created using computers

Digital painting is either a physical painting made with the use of digital electronics and spray paint robotics within the digital art fine art context or pictorial art imagery made with pixels on a computer screen that mimics artworks from the traditional histories of painting and illustration.

== Technological origins ==
=== Sketchpad ===
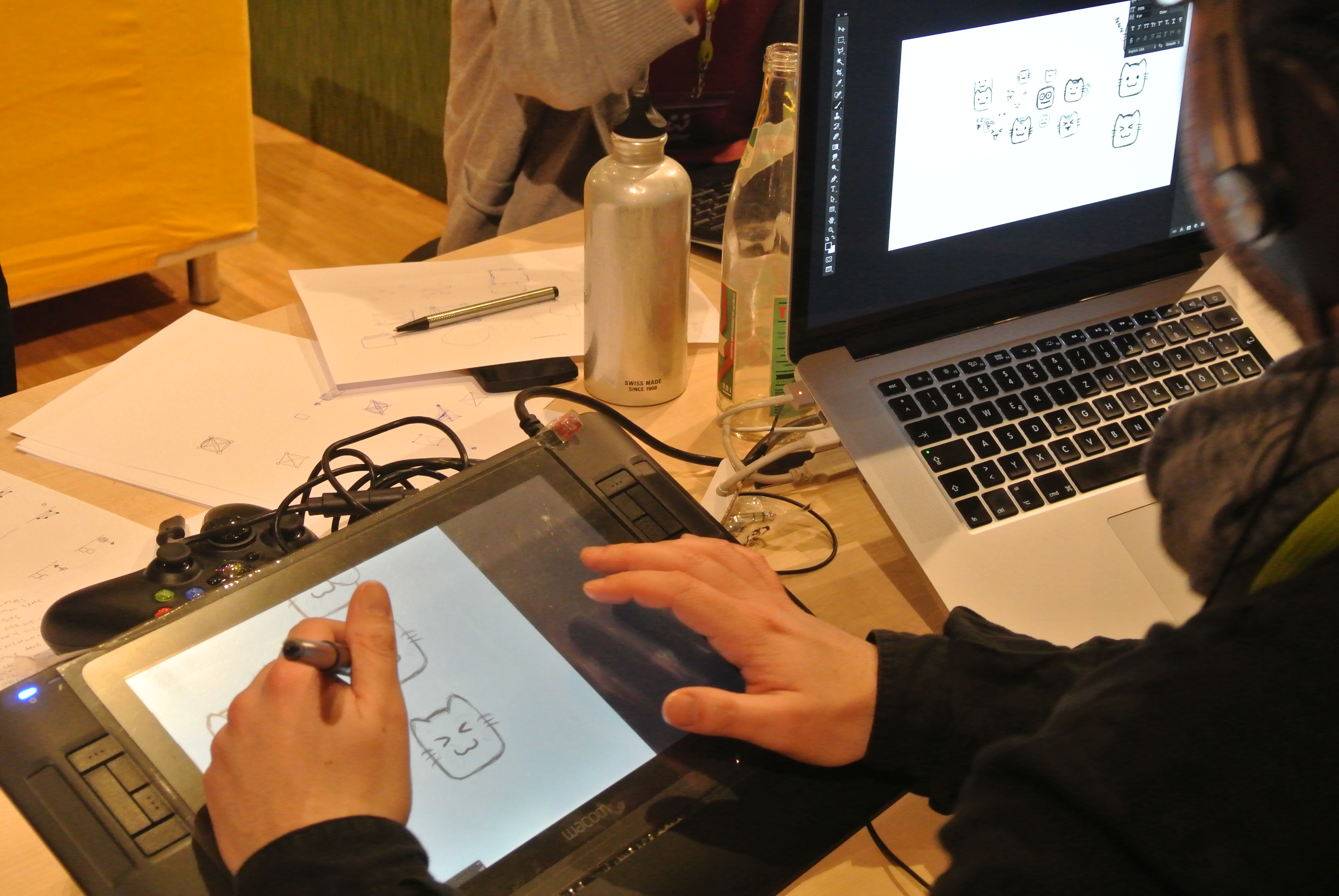
An artist drawing on a graphics tablet in 2014

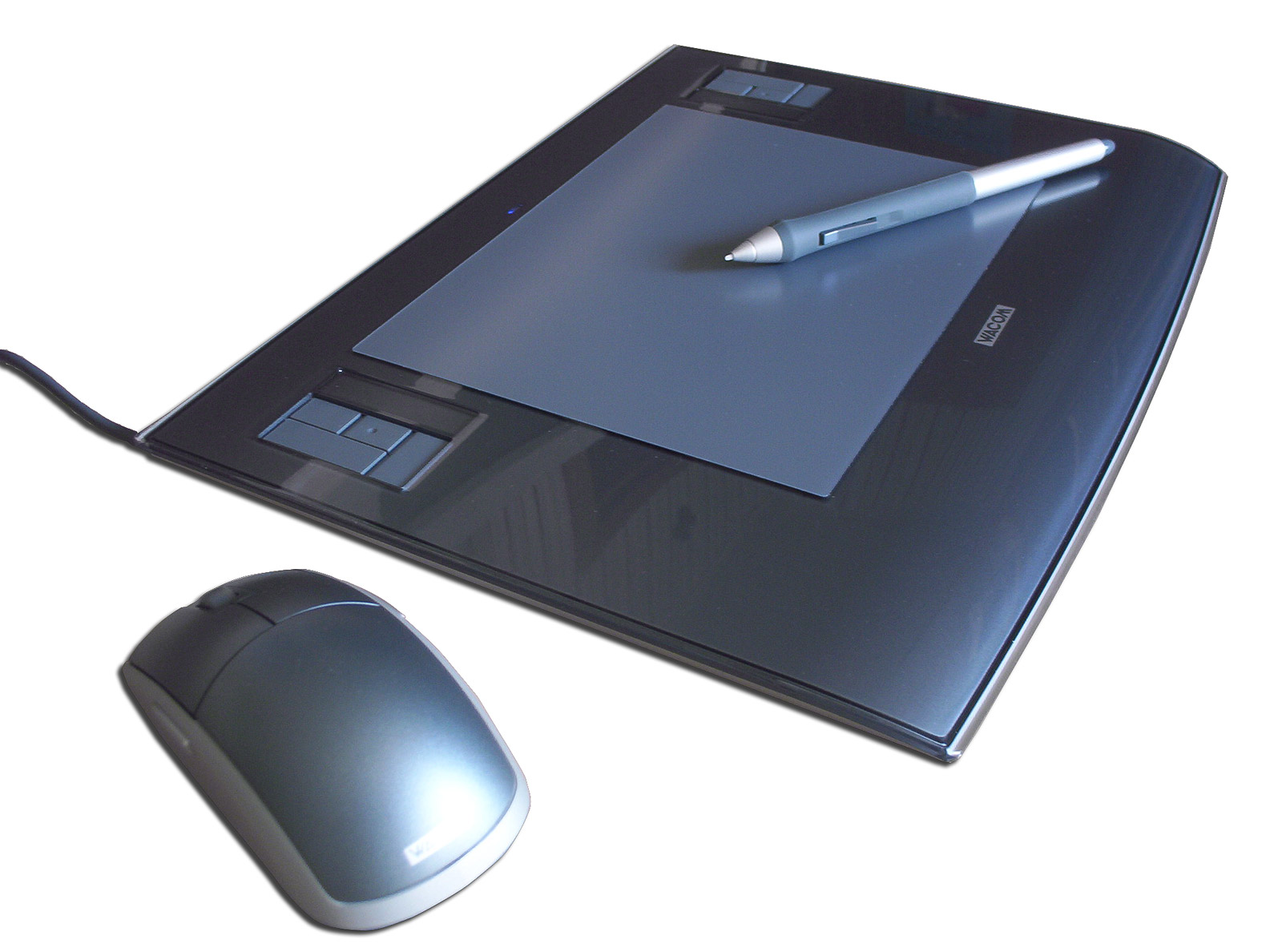
Graphics hand tablet used to create digital paintings instead of using a mouse

The earliest graphical manipulation program was called Sketchpad. Created in 1963 by Ivan Sutherland, a grad student at MIT, Sketchpad allowed the user to manipulate objects on a cathode-ray tube (CRT). Sketchpad eventually led to the creation of the Rand Tablet for work on the GRAIL project in 1968, and the very first tablet was created. Other early tablets, or digitizers, like the ID (intelligent digitizer) and the BitPad were commercially successful and used in CAD (Computer Aided Design) programs. Modern-day graphics tablets are the tools of choice by digital painters.

=== Tablets ===
The idea of using a tablet to communicate directions to a computer has been an idea since 1968 when the RAND (Research and Development) company out of Santa Monica, developed the RAND tablet that was used to program. Digitizers were popularized in the mid-1970s and early 1980s by the commercial success of the ID (Intelligent Digitizer) and BitPad manufactured by the Summagraphics Corp. These digitizers were used as the input device for many high-end CAD (computer aided design) systems as well as bundled with PCs and PC-based CAD software like AutoCAD.

=== MacPaint ===
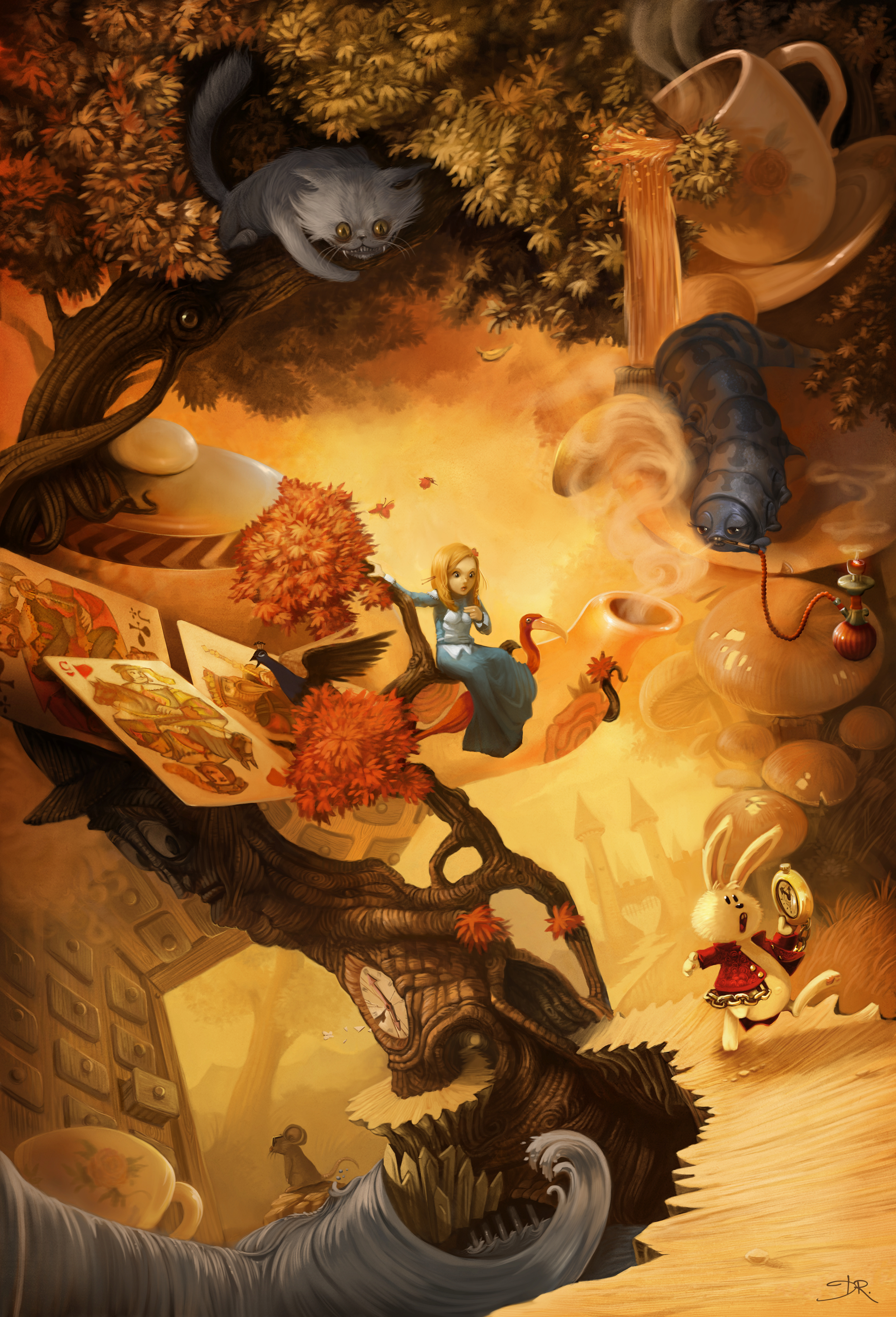
Alice in Wonderland, a 2010 digital illustration by David Revoy depicting some elements and characters from the 1865 novel

An early commercial program that allowed users to design, draw, and manipulate objects was the program MacPaint. This program's first version was introduced on January 22, 1984, on the Apple Lisa. The ability to freehand draw and create graphics with this program made it the top program of its kind during 1984. The earlier versions of the program were called MacSketch and LisaSketch, and the last version of MacPaint was MacPaint 2.0 released in 1998.

Much of MacPaint's universal success was attributed to the release of the first Macintosh computer equipped with another program called MacWrite. It was the first personal computer with a graphical user interface and lost much of the bulky size of its predecessor, the Lisa. The Macintosh was available at about $2500 and the combination of a smaller design made the computer a hit, exposing the average computer user to the graphical possibilities of the included MacPaint.

=== Adobe ===
Another early image manipulation program was Adobe Photoshop. It was first called Display and was created in 1987 by Thomas Knoll at the University of Michigan as a monochrome picture display program. With help from his brother John, the program was turned into an image editing program called Imagepro but later changed to Photoshop.

The Knolls agreed on a deal with Adobe Systems and Apple, and Photoshop 1.0 was released in 1991 for Macintosh. Adobe Systems had previously released Adobe Illustrator 1.0 in 1986 on the Apple Macintosh. These two programs, Adobe Photoshop and Adobe Illustrator are currently two of the top programs used to produce digital paintings.

Illustrator introduced the uses of Bezier curves, which allowed the user to be incredibly detailed in their vector drawings.

=== Kid Pix ===
In 1988, Craig Hickman created a paint program called Kid Pix, which made it easier for children to create digital art. The program was created in black in white and after several revisions, was released in color in 1991. Kid Pix was one of the first commercial programs to integrate color and sound in a creative format. While the Kid Pix was intentionally created for children, it became a useful tool for introducing adults to the computer as well.

=== Corel Painter ===
Corel Painter was created in 1991 by Mark Zimmer and Tom Hedges of Fractal Design.

=== Krita ===
Krita is a free and open-source raster graphics editor designed primarily for digital art and 2D animation. Early development of the project can be tracked back to 1998. In 2009, the software increased its focus on digital painting, for a target audience of cartoonists, illustrators and concept artists.

=== Web-based painting programs ===
In recent years there has been a growth in the websites supporting online painting. The user is still drawing digitally with the use of software: often the software is on the server of the website which is being used. However, with the emergence of HTML5, some programs now partly use the client's web browser to handle some processing. The range of tools and brushes can be more limited than free-standing software. Speed of response, quality of color, and the ability to save to a file or print are similar in either media.

== Applications ==
=== Entertainment and film ===
In film production, digital painting is used for concept art, matte paintings and visual effects. Artists use these digital tools to design environments, characters and scenes that guide the visual development of the film. Matte painting, for example, allows the creation of realistic backgrounds and settings which are impossible to film in real life. Clip Studio Paint, Krita and Blender are top tools in this industry.

=== Video game industry ===
In video game development, concept artists use digital tools and techniques to visualize characters, environments and assets, providing a visual blueprint for the game’s aesthetic and design. Tools commonly used are ZBrush and PaintTool SAI.

=== Advertising and marketing ===
In advertising, digital painting has become an important tool for creating visuals for campaigns. Brands use digital illustrations to create advertisements which grabs attention and resonate with the target audience. For example, Coca Cola have used digital art in their marketing to engage with consumers through innovative and interactive content.

=== Publishing ===
Publishing uses digital painting (with tools like Corel Painter and Adobe Photoshop) for book covers, illustrations and graphic novels. With the help of the digital tools, artists can now produce high quality and detailed artwork faster. Rick Berry is one of the renowned artists in the publishing industry who created the first digitally painted book cover for the novel, Neuromancer.

== List of digital art software ==
List of digital art software
Software	Developer	Platform	License
Adobe Fresco	Adobe Inc.	Windows, macOS, iOS, iPadOS	Freemium
Adobe Photoshop	Adobe Inc.	Windows, macOS	Proprietary
Adobe Illustrator	Adobe Inc.	Windows, macOS	Proprietary
Adobe Substance 3D Modeler	Adobe Inc.	Windows, macOS	Proprietary
Corel Painter	Corel Corporation	Windows, macOS	Proprietary
Clip Studio Paint	Celsys, Inc.	Windows, macOS, iOS, Android	Proprietary
Affinity Designer	Serif	Windows, macOS	Proprietary
ArtRage	Ambient Design Ltd	Windows, macOS, iOS, Android	Proprietary EULA
Autodesk SketchBook	Sketchbook, Inc.	Windows, macOS, iOS, Android	Freemium
GIMP	GNU Image Manipulation Program	Windows, macOS, Linux	Open source: GPLv3
ibisPaint	ibis Inc.	Windows, iOS, Android	Proprietary/freemium
Infinite Painter	Infinite Studio LLC	iOS, Android	Freemium
Inkscape	Inkscape Developers	Windows, macOS, Linux	Open source: GPLv2
Krita	Krita Foundation	Windows, macOS, Linux	Open source: GPLv3
FireAlpaca	PGN Inc.	Windows, macOS	Proprietary/freeware
mdiapp	nattou.org	Windows	Proprietary
MediBang Paint	MediBang Inc.	Windows, macOS, iOS, Android	Proprietary/freeware
openCanvas	PGN Inc.	Windows	Proprietary
Procreate	Savage Interactive	iPadOS	Proprietary
HiPaint	Aige Technology	iOS, Android	Proprietary/freeware
Rebelle	Escape Motions	Windows, macOS	Proprietary
Epic Pen Pro	Epic Games	Windows	Proprietary
Paint Tool SAI	Systemax Software	Windows	Proprietary
MyPaint	MyPaint Contributors	Windows, macOS, Linux	Open source: GPLv2
Paintstorm Studio	Paintstorm Studio Team	Windows, macOS, iPadOS	Proprietary
Flame Painter	Escape Motions	Windows, macOS	Proprietary
TwistedBrush	Pixarra	Windows, macOS	Proprietary
ZBrush	Pixologic	Windows, macOS	Proprietary

== See also ==
- Art software
- Brain painting
- Computer art
- Computer graphics
- Digital Art by Microsoft
- Digital illustration
- Digital photography
- Electronic art
- New Media
- Software art
