= Adobe Fresco =

Graphics editor

- Developer: Adobe Inc.
- Release: November 2019; 6 years ago
Stable release
- Windows: 5.7
- iPadOS: 7.2.0
- Written in: C++, Objective-C
- Operating system: iOS 17 or later; iPadOS 17 or later; Windows 10 or later
- Available in: 19 languages
- Type: Raster graphics editor
- License: Proprietary, Freemium
- Website: adobe.com/products/fresco.html

Adobe Fresco is a vector and raster graphics editor developed by Adobe mainly used for digital painting. Originally designed for the Apple iPad with Pencil support, development for Adobe Fresco began in late 2019. Along with Creative Cloud, Fresco was released as part of CC 2019.

== History ==
Adobe Fresco for iPad with Pencil support was first announced in November 2018, and was released in November 2019 as said in Adobe MAX 2019.

The Adobe Fresco app has since been made free of charge to use, but it has a premium subscription that can be purchased separately or along with the Creative Cloud All Apps subscription.

In 2022, Adobe Fresco was reviewed as an easy way to create art with sketching, painting, and watercolor on an iPad.

== Features ==
The user interface contains different features including Live and Vector Brushes, basic photo editing, layering, and more. It also offers Perspective grids and supports basic animation with motion tools introduced in 2021. The sidebars that are found at each edge of the screen contains a variety of tools to select, create, and manipulate objects or artworks in Fresco. These tools can be selected as following: drawing, typing, painting, reshaping, slicing and cutting, symbolism, moving and zooming, and sketching.

== Release history ==
Release history of Adobe Fresco, sorted by version number:

Version	Platforms	Release date	Notable features
1.0.1 (Beta)	iOS (iPad only)	September 2019	Additional languages added.
1.0.2	iOS (iPad only)	September 2019	Official release for Adobe Fresco.
1.0.3	iOS (iPad only)	October 2019	
1.1	iOS (iPad only), Windows	November 2019	Straight edge, Creative Cloud color libraries, Fresco for Windows
1.2	iOS (iPad only), Windows	December 2019	Reporting bugs
1.2.1	iOS (iPad only), Windows	December 2019	
1.3.1	iOS (iPad only), Windows	February 2020	Improved undo and redo, Photoshop import, and more
1.4	iOS (iPad only), Windows	March 2020	Advanced taper
1.4.1	iOS (iPad only), Windows	March 2020	
1.5	iOS (iPad only), Windows	April 2020	Integration with the new Photoshop for iPad, AirDrop support, keyboard shortcuts
1.6	iOS (iPad only), Windows	May 2020	New shapes, multicolor eyedrop, vector trim, and more
1.6.1	iOS (iPad only), Windows	May 2020	
1.7	iOS (iPad only), Windows	June 2020	Snapline, new tutorials, charcoal brushes
1.7.1	iOS (iPad only), Windows	July 2020	
1.8	iOS (iPad only), Windows	July 2020	Clipping masks
1.8.1	iOS (iPad only), Windows	August 2020	
1.9	iOS (iPad only), Windows	August 2020	Brush stamp, brush management, updated touch shortcut map
2.0.3	iOS, Windows	October 2020	Fresco for iPhone, text support, smudge brushes, and more
2.0.4	iOS, Windows	October 2020	
2.0.5	iOS, Windows	November 2020	
2.1	iOS, Windows	December 2020	Pixel brush angle control
2.2	iOS, Windows	February 2021	Invite to edit, Adobe Capture integration, faster brushes, and more
2.3.1	iOS, Windows	March 2021	Easier color pick-up, smaller Photoshop brushes, copy and paste objects
2.4	iOS, Windows	April 2021	Multi-layer drag and drop, nudge, oil texture in merged layers, and more
2.5	iOS, Windows	May 2021	Drawing aids, redesigned Shapes menu, simplified UX, and more
2.6	iOS, Windows	June 2021	
2.6.1	iOS, Windows	June 2021	
2.7.2	iOS, Windows	July 2021	
2.7.3	iOS, Windows	July 2021	
2.7.5	iOS, Windows	August 2021	
2.7.6	iOS, Windows	August 2021	
2.7.7	iOS, Windows	September 2021	
2.7.8	iOS, Windows	September 2021	
2.7.9	iOS, Windows	October 2021	
3.0.0	iOS, Windows	October 2021	
3.0.1	iOS, Windows	October 2021	
3.0.2	iOS, Windows	November 2021	
3.1.0	iOS, Windows	November 2021	
3.1.1	iOS, Windows	November 2021	
3.2.1	iOS, Windows	December 2021	
3.2.2	iOS, Windows	December 2021	
3.2.3	iOS, Windows	January 2022	
3.3.0	iOS, Windows	February 2022	
3.3.1	iOS, Windows	February 2022	
3.4.0	iOS, Windows	March 2022	
3.6.1	iOS, Windows	May 2022	
3.6.2	iOS, Windows	June 2022	
3.7.0	iOS, Windows	June 2022	
3.7.5	iOS, Windows	July 2022	
3.8.0	iOS, Windows	August 2022	
3.9.1	iOS, Windows	September 2022	
4.0.0	iOS, Windows	October 2022	
4.0.1	iOS, Windows	October 2022	
4.1.0	iOS, Windows	November 2022	
4.1.1	iOS, Windows	December 2022	
4.2.0	iOS, Windows	December 2022	
4.2.	iOS, Windows	December 2022	
4.3	iOS, Windows	February 2023	Snap to shape, Add motion on clipped layers, select & fill disconnected areas, and more
4.4	iOS, Windows	March 2023	
4.4.2	iOS, Windows	April 2023	
4.6.0	iOS, Windows	May 8, 2023	
4.6.1	iOS, Windows	May 20, 2023	
4.7.0	iOS, Windows	Jun 19, 2023	
4.7.1	iOS, Windows	Jun 29, 2023	
4.8.0	iOS, Windows	Aug 21, 2023	
5.0.0	iOS, Windows	Sep 18, 2023	
5.0.1	iOS, Windows	Oct 30, 2023	
5.0.2	iOS, Windows	Nov 14, 2023	
5.0.3	iOS, Windows	Nov 18, 2023	
5.2	iOS, Windows	Dec 5, 2023	
5.3.0	iOS, Windows	Jan 29, 2024	
5.4.0	iOS, Windows	Feb 27, 2024	
5.4.1	iOS, Windows	Mar 14, 2024	
5.6.0	iOS, Windows	Apr 29, 2024	
5.6.5	iOS, Windows	Jun 13, 2024	
5.7.0	iOS, Windows	Jul 9, 2024	
6.0.0	iOS, Windows	Sept 16, 2024	
6.7	iOS	Sept 2025	
7.0	iOS	Oct 2025	
7.1	iOS	Dec 2025	
7.2	iOS	Feb 2026	Updated elements panel, Pose improvements
7.3	iOS	May 2026	Toolbar and taskbar moved for easier access
7.4	iOS	June 2026	

== See also ==
- Adobe Illustrator
- Autodesk SketchBook
- Clip Studio Paint
- Krita
