= ArtRage =

Bitmap graphics editor by Ambient Design Ltd.

- ArtRage 3.5
- Developer: Ambient Design Ltd
- Stable release: 6 / June 2019; 7 years ago
- Operating system: Microsoft Windows, macOS, iOS, Android
- Type: Raster graphics editor
- License: Proprietary EULA
- Website: www.artrage.com

ArtRage is a bitmap graphics editor for digital painting created by Ambient Design Ltd. It currently supports Windows, macOS and mobile Apple and Android devices and is available in multiple languages. ArtRage 5 was announced in January 2017 and released in February 2017.

The software is designed to be used with a tablet PC or graphics tablet, but can be used with a regular mouse as well. Its mediums include tools such as oil paint, spray paint, pencil, acrylic, and others, using "realistic" physics to simulate actual painting.

== Tools and features ==
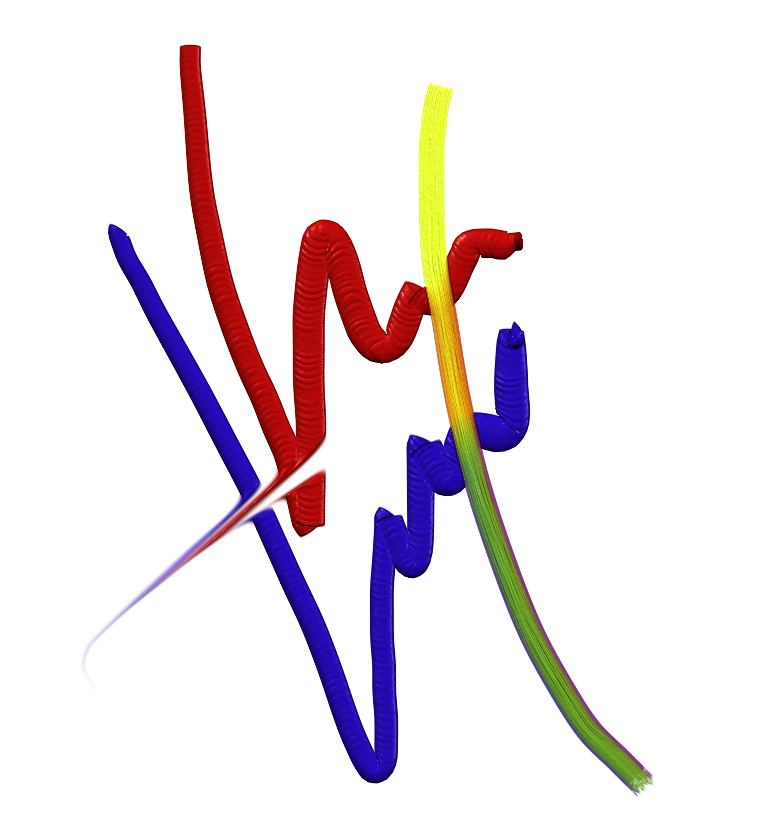
A selection of the blendable textures of paint and colour mixing in ArtRage 4

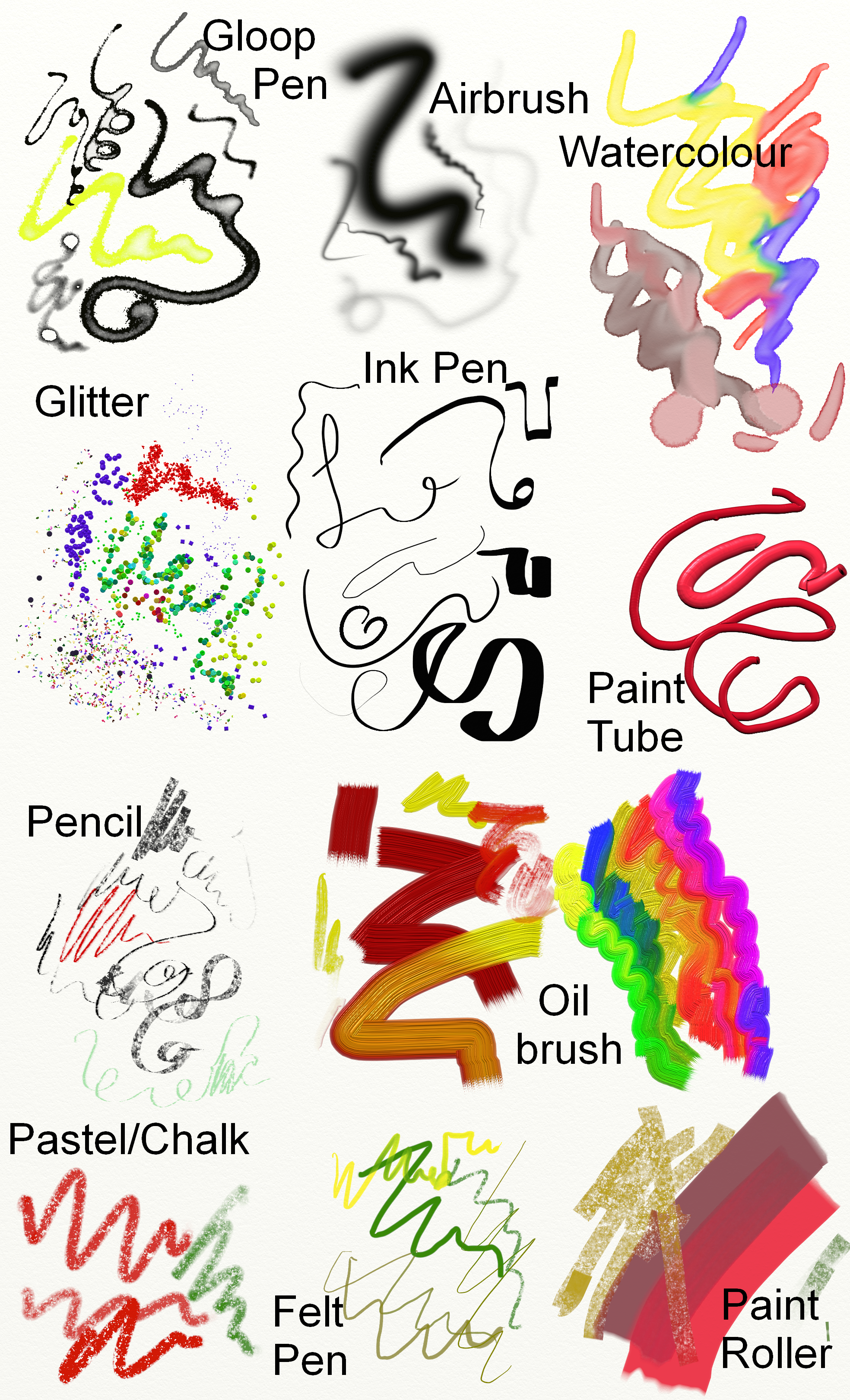
An example of the painting tools in ArtRage 4: Gloop Pen, Airbrush, Glitter, Ink Pen, Pencil, Oil Brush, Watercolor, Paint Tube, Paint Roller, Pastel/Chalk, Pencil, Felt Pen

The software includes varying thickness and textures of media and canvas, the ability to mix media, and a "realistic" colour blending option, as well as digital RGB blending. Other tools include tracing, smearing, blurring, mixing, symmetry, different types of paper for the "canvas" (e.g. crumpled paper, smooth paper, wrinkled tin foil, etc.), as well as special effects, custom brushes and digital editing tools. Later versions (Studio, Studio Pro, and ArtRage 4) include more standard digital tools, such as Select, Transform, Cloner, Symmetry, Fill, and custom brushes. Each tool comes with several presets, with additional customisation options available. It is possible to share custom resources between users.

Traditional drawing tools	Other features
Airbrush Gloop Pen Glitter, Ink Pen, Pencil, Oil Brush, Watercolor, Paint Tube, Paint Roller, Pastel/Chalk, Pencil, Felt Pen, Eraser, Palette Knife, Stencils, Sticker Spray, Rulers, Metallic	Select, Cloner, Fill, Transform, Symmetry, Gradients, Layers, Tracing, Reference Images, Scrap Layers, View panels, Text, Filters, Layer Blur, Presets, Canvas options, Customisable Workbench, Scripts, Grids, Pattern Fill, Gradient Fill, Custom Brush, Perspective, Guides, Warp (liquify)

Real colour blending

ArtRage offers a specialised colour blending option as well as standard digital RGB based blending. It is turned off by default as it is memory intensive but can be turned on from the Tools menu. The most noticeable effect is that green is produced when yellow and blue are mixed.

The color picker supports HSL and RGB colors.

== Custom resources ==
Users can create their own versions of various resources and tools, or record scripts, and share them with other users. Users can save their resource collections as a Package File (.arpack), which allows folders of resources to be shared and automatically installed. ArtRage can import some Photoshop filters, but not all. It only supports .ttf (TrueType Fonts) which it reads from the computer's fonts folder.

Package files do not work with versions earlier than 3.5. ArtRage Studio does not support Photoshop filters, or allow sticker creation, and has fewer options overall. Individual resources can be shared directly, though most resources have specific file types.

Resource/tool	File type
Colour Set	.col
Colour Picker	Any image file
Canvases	.cpr
Stencil	PNG or JPEG
Stickers & Sticker Spray Presets (custom brushes)	.stk
Scripts	.arscript
Tool Preset	.prs
Gradients	.argrad
Package File	.arpack

== Versions ==
Seven editions of ArtRage currently exist. Mobile apps include versions for Android, iPhone, and iPad. A version called ArtRage Touch is also available for Metro devices. Desktop editions include Lite and ArtRage 4, a free demo version of the latter also being available. ArtRage 1, ArtRage 2, ArtRage Studio and ArtRage Studio Pro have been discontinued.

ArtRage was made available on Steam on October 10, 2012, as part of the very first non-gaming software launch on the platform. The Steam version does not include DRM and can be used without Steam running.

=== Languages ===
ArtRage 4 is available in several languages, but the manual is only available in English. The other versions have manuals available in assorted languages. Language is chosen when installing the program (except for the ArtRage 2 alternative editions).

Language	ArtRage 2.6 Full Edition	ArtRage Studio and Studio Pro	ArtRage 4	ArtRage Lite	iPad	iPhone	Android (free + paid)
Chinese (Simplified)	Yes*	Yes*	No	Yes + Manual	No	No	Yes + Manual
Chinese (Traditional)	No	Yes*	No	Yes + Manual	No	No	Yes + Manual
Dutch	Yes	Yes	Yes	Yes + Manual	Yes	No	No
English	Yes + Manual	Yes + Manual	Yes + Manual	Yes + Manual	Yes + Manual	Yes + Manual	Yes + Manual
French	Yes + Manual	Yes + Manual	Yes	Yes + Manual	Yes	No	Yes + Manual
German	Yes + Manual	Yes	Yes	Yes + Manual	Yes	No	Yes + Manual
Greek	Yes	No	No	No	No	No	No
Italian	Yes + Manual	Yes + Manual	Yes	Yes + Manual	Yes	No	No
Japanese	Yes*	Yes	Yes	Yes + Manual	Yes	No	Yes + Manual
Korean	No	Yes	No	No	Yes	No	Yes + Manual
Portuguese	Yes	Yes	No	No	No	No	Yes + Manual
Portuguese (Brazil)	Yes	Yes	No	No	No	No	No
Russian	Yes	Yes	Yes	Yes + Manual	No	No	Yes + Manual
Spanish	Yes	Yes	Yes	Yes + Manual	Yes	No	Yes + Manual
Spanish (Latin America)	Yes	Yes	No	No	No	No	No
Turkish	Yes + Manual	Yes	No	No	No	No	No

Japanese/Chinese are only available as Alternative Editions in ArtRage 2

- ArtRage Studio & Studio Pro Wacom China Editions support English, Traditional Chinese, and Simplified Chinese.
- ArtRage 2 Japanese Edition supports: Japanese and English interfaces and manuals.
- ArtRage 2 Wacom China Edition supports Simplified Chinese interface.

=== Release history ===
There is no official release schedule, and new updates are announced as they are ready. New editions typically release on a three to four year upgrade cycle. Major updates may occur halfway through a cycle (referred to as the "X.5" edition) alongside ongoing patches and minor updates. Some updates continue for the previous version, although support is slowly phased out over time. Backdated upgrades to Studio Pro included bug fixes, DRM removal for Steam users, and a fix to work properly on OS X Mavericks. The iPad version was updated to include Retina support.

Release date	Edition	Platform	Latest version	Price (USD)	Last Updated	Available
2004	ArtRage 1 (Starter)	Windows/Mac OS X	?	Free		Discontinued
2006	ArtRage 2 (also known as ArtRage Deluxe)	Windows/Mac OS X	2.6.0	$25	May 2010	Discontinued
2009	ArtRage Studio / ArtRage Studio Pro	Windows/Mac OS X	3.5.12	$40 / $80	2014	Discontinued
2010	ArtRage for iOS (previously ArtRage for iPad)	iOS	2.3.3	$4.99	Dec 2017	Current
2012	ArtRage for iPhone	iOS	1.0.4	$1.99	July 2013	Discontinued
2013	ArtRage 4	Windows/OS X	4.5.10	$49.90	May 2016	Discontinued
2014	ArtRage for Android	Android	1.4.5	$2.99	October 2021	Current
2015	ArtRage Touch	Windows 8 App	1.0.3	$9.99	March 2016	Discontinued
2015	ArtRage Lite	Windows/OS X	5.0.9	$29.90	2018	Current
2015	ArtRage Oil Painter Free	Android	1.1.0	Free	May 2016	Current
2017	ArtRage 5	Windows/macOS	5.0.8	$79	August 2018	Discontinued
2019	ArtRage 6	Windows/macOS	6.1.2	$59	October 2019	Current
2021	ArtRage Vitae	Windows/macOS	7.1.4	$80	2023	Current
2021	ArtRage Vitae Mobile	iOS/Android	1.1.5	$4.99	April 2023	Current

Free demo versions

These were released alongside their respective editions, as trial software. Demos prior to ArtRage 4 are unavailable. Work can only be exported to JPEG format and contains an ArtRage watermark. Images larger than 1280x1024 cannot be saved or exported.

- ArtRage 2.2 Free Edition: limited trial version
- Studio Pro Demo Edition: full trial version with some restrictions, expires after 30 days
- ArtRage 4 Demo edition: full trial version with some restrictions
- ArtRage Touch: one week trial through the Windows App Store
- ArtRage Oil Painter Free : limited free app on the Play Store and Amazon App Store
- ArtRage for Android: free download on some Samsung devices via the Galaxy Gifts program

=== Software downloads ===
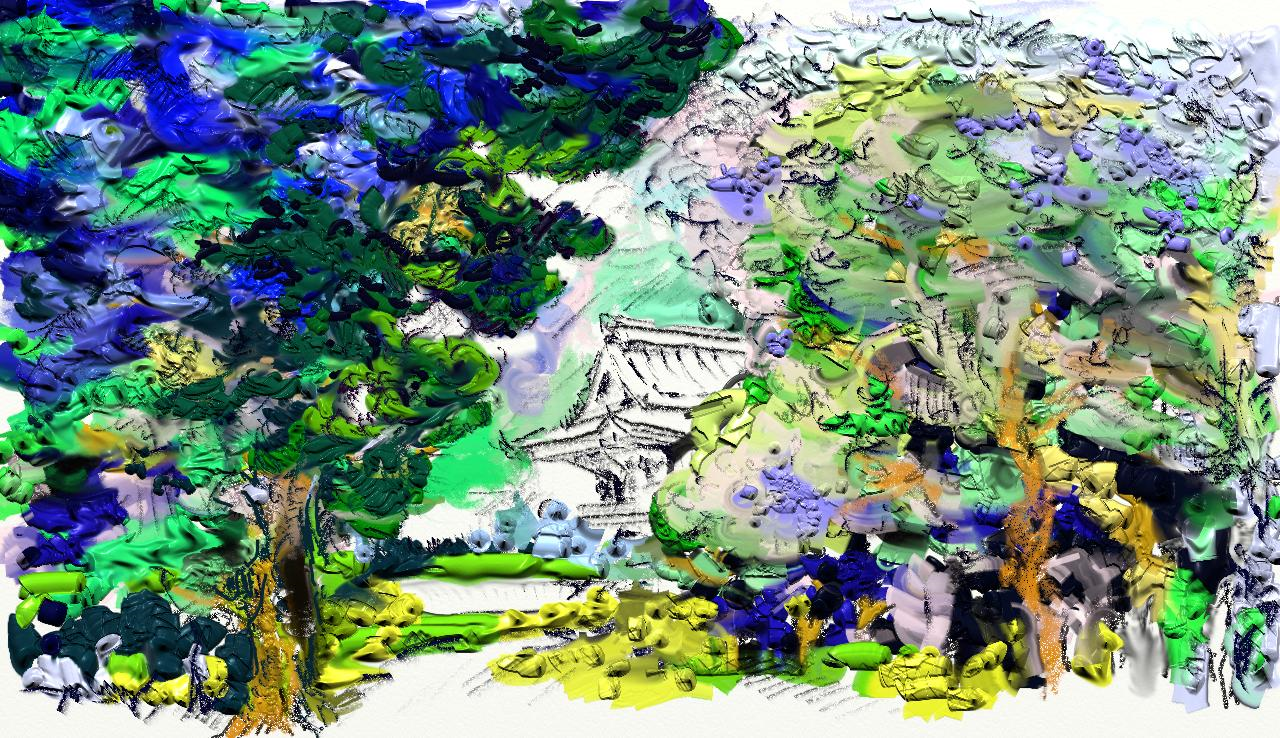
Pen Types

ArtRage is only sold individually as an online download. It can be bought directly from the company website, or through Steam, but is not sold on any other websites. The free demo is only available from the main site. The mobile (iPad and iPhone) versions can only be bought via the Apple app store and cannot be registered on the ArtRage site. The Android version is available from the GALAXY Gift store for specific Samsung devices, and will be made available on the Samsung Apps and Google Play stores.

==== Upgrades ====
Upgrading from ArtRage Lite or any pre-existing desktop editions gives a permanent 50% discount on ArtRage 4 (the most recent full desktop edition). This upgrade discount is handled separately by the Steam and the ArtRage stores, so users cannot currently switch between stores.

To upgrade, owners must register their serial number in the ArtRage members area (unless it is a Steam or mobile version). This also allows users to download both the macOS and the Windows versions of their software at any time, an unlimited number of times.

Steam and mobile versions are updated through Steam and the App Store.

=== Hardware bundles ===
The ArtRage for Android app was released as part of a bundle deal with Samsung. It is free for the new Samsung Galaxy Note 4 and Samsung Galaxy Note Edge smartphones, distributed through the GALAXY Gifts store, and is available for purchase from the Galaxy App store for other Samsung devices. It was released for sale on the Google Play Store in February 2015. Older editions of ArtRage also come as bundled software with various devices. ArtRage 2 and ArtRage Studio Pro are available bundled with several WACOM graphics tablets, as well as various other devices, such as ASUS EP121 tablets, Sony VAIO Laptops, and Adesso Cybertablets. The serial numbers in these cases are handled by the companies distributing the hardware. ArtRage is usually provided as a software download, although it can come pre-installed or on an accompanying CD.

A version of ArtRage called "Ink Art" was included in Microsoft's Experience Pack for the Tablet PC in 2005 and on some older Wacom tablets. Ink Art contained a subset of features offered in the full ArtRage program. Promethean Planet, an educator community, distributes a free version of ArtRage for classroom use on Promethean's range of interactive whiteboards.

==== Sony Duo PCs ====
ArtRage is included on the following models from the Sony Duo touchscreen range.

- Sony VAIO Tap 20
- Sony VAIO Duo 11
- Sony VAIO L24
- Sony VAIO E14P
- Sony VAIO T13
- Sony VAIO Duo 13

==== Wacom Tablet models ====
(see full Tablet details here)

Tablet model number	Name		Bundled software	
Tablet model number	Americas	Europe	Americas	Europe
CTL490DW CTL490DB	Intuos Draw	Intuos Draw	ArtRage Lite	ArtRage Lite
CTH-670	Create	Fun M Pen & Touch	Autodesk SketchBook Express; Adobe Photoshop Elements; Corel Painter Essentials; Nik Color Filters	ArtRage 3; Adobe Photoshop Elements 10; Corel Painter Essentials 4; Bamboo Dock
CTH-470	Capture	Fun S Pen & Touch	Autodesk SketchBook Express; Adobe Photoshop Elements; Nik Color Filters	ArtRage 3 Studio; Adobe Photoshop Elements 9; Bamboo Dock
CTL-471	Splash	—N/a	Autodesk SketchBook Express; ArtRage 3 Studio	—N/a
CTL-470	Connect	Pen	Autodesk SketchBook Express	ArtRage 2.6; Bamboo Dock
MTE-450	Bamboo		?	
CTF-430	?	One	—N/a	ArtRage 2; Bamboo Link

== System support ==
ArtRage 4.5 has full 64-bit support on Windows and Macs. There are also iOS supported versions for iPhone and iPad.

ArtRage for Android supports Ice Cream Sandwich 4.0 and later.

Operating System	ArtRage 2	ArtRage Studio/ Studio Pro	ArtRage 4	ArtRage Lite	ArtRage Touch	ArtRage for iPhone /iPad	ArtRage for Android
Mac OS 10.4 and earlier	Yes	No	No	No	No	N/A	N/A
Power PC Macs	Yes	No	No	No	No	N/A	N/A
Mac OS 10.5	Yes	Yes	No	No	No	N/A	N/A
Mac OS 10.6-8	Yes	Yes	Yes	Yes	No	N/A	N/A
Mac OS 9 and later	Yes	Yes∞	Yes	Yes	No	N/A	N/A
Windows XP	Yes	Yes	No∞∞	No	No	N/A	N/A
Windows Vista	Yes	Yes	Yes	Yes	No	N/A	N/A
Windows 7	Yes	Yes	Yes	Yes	No	N/A	N/A
Windows 8	Yes	Yes	Yes	Yes	Yes	N/A	N/A
Windows 10	Yes	Yes∞∞∞	Yes∞∞∞	Yes	Yes	N/A	N/A
Linux on Wine∞∞∞∞	Yes	Mostly	No∞∞∞∞∞	No∞∞∞∞∞	No	N/A	N/A
iOS4 and later	N/A	N/A	N/A	N/A	N/A	<1.6	N/A
iOS8 and later	N/A	N/A	N/A	N/A	N/A	2.0>	N/A
Ice Cream Sandwich 4.0 +	N/A	N/A	N/A	N/A	N/A	N/A	Yes

_{∞Mavericks support added in ArtRage Studio/ Studio Pro versions 3.5.10 and 3.5.11
∞∞ Windows XP support was dropped in the 4.5 update. The XP compatible version of ArtRage 4 is still available for existing and future owners of the program through the member area.
∞∞∞ ArtRage 3 Multithreading is not compatible with Windows 10. Disable this in ArtRage Preferences.
∞∞∞∞Linux support is unofficial.
∞∞∞∞∞ The Wine installer for ArtRage 4 does not currently work, but it can be worked around by copying program files from a Windows installation}

=== Stylus support ===
ArtRage 4 supports various Wacom stylus features, although they may vary depending on the tool being used.

- Pressure, Tilt, Airbrush Wheel, and Barrel Rotation
- Wacom Stylus Recognition
- Live Tilt (4.5 only)

ArtRage for iPad supports four Bluetooth stylus brands, as well as the Apple Pencil, which has full pressure and tilt support.

- Wacom
- TenOne Pogo Connect
- Adonit Jot Touch Pro
- Adobe Creative

ArtRage for Android supports the native Android system for pressure sensitivity, including the Samsung S Pen.

The desktop editions of ArtRage fully support the following Windows Graphics tablet and Tablet computer drivers:

- AES (ArtRage 4.5.10 onwards)
- WinTab
- RealTime Stylus
- Ink Services (ArtRage 2 only)

=== Supported file types ===
ArtRage uses a proprietary file type, ".ptg", which stands for "painting". It can only save as PTG and can only open PSD and PTG files using the File|Open command. However, images can be exported to the following formats: PNG, JPEG, GIF, BMP, TIFF and Adobe Photoshop's .psd format. ArtRage can import all of these file types using the File > Import Image or Import Image as Layer command. Importing PTG files will open the PNG used for thumbnail images instead (this can be used to rescue images from corrupted PTG files).

Exported File Type	Layers	Transparency
BMP	No	No
JPEG	No	No
GIF	No	No
PNG	No	Yes
TIFF	No	Yes*
PSD	Yes	Yes

*Only when exported as an individual layer

Transparency
ArtRage supports transparency on imported files, but not on all exported files (for example, GIF and TIFF). It is often easier to export a transparent image as an individual layer, as the Canvas settings can save as opaque on full saves for some file types and in older editions.

== Ambient Design ==
Ambient Design Ltd. is a New Zealand-based software development and publishing firm, specializing in creative applications and user interfaces for artists. It was founded in 2000 by Andy Bearsley and Matt Fox-Wilson. The founders formerly worked for MetaCreations, the developer of Painter, Bryce and Kai's Power Tools, and have worked for Corel, Adobe, Digital Anarchy and Jasc Software. Before that, they developed Deep Paint 3D for Right Hemisphere Ltd, and hid various Easter Eggs in the code.

=== Awards ===
- December 2004 Microsoft® Tablet PC Does Your Application Think in Ink? grand prize winner for ArtRage 1
- March 2012 "Hot One" Award for Best New Gear from Professional Photographer for ArtRage Studio Pro (edition 3.5)
- March 2014 Parents' Choice Gold Award for ArtRage for iPad

== See also ==
- Digital Art
- Digital Painting
- Art software
- Computer painting
- Graphic art software
- Raster graphics
- List of raster graphics editors
- Comparison of raster graphics editors
