= Rebelle =

Rebelle may refer to:

- the original French language title of War Witch, a Canadian film released in 2012
- the French language title of Brave (2012 film), an American animated film
- Rebelle (fragrance), a fragrance released by Rihanna
- Rebelles, a Canadian political magazine
- Rebelle (software), a raster graphics editor
- Rebelle Records, a record company founded by Swedish Singer Björn Afzelius in 1988
