= Gary Kaleda =

American painter

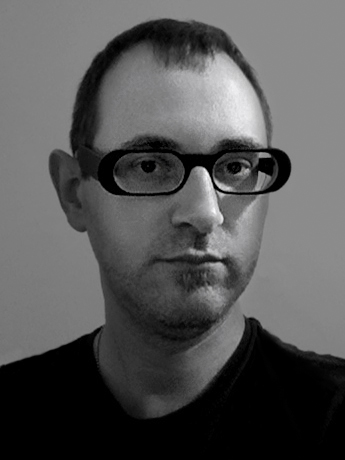
- Gary Kaleda, 2011
- Born: July 4, 1966 (age 60); Long Island, New York
- Education: Pratt Institute, Brooklyn, NY
- Known for: Digital Painting

Gary Kaleda (born July 4, 1966) is a contemporary digital artist based in New York City. Exploring the complex relationship between humanity and technology, Kaleda’s work centers on the underlying fear, uncertainty and beauty of the digital age. He is also known for pioneering the use of QR codes within his paintings.

== Background ==
=== Early life ===
Born on Long Island, New York in 1966, Gary Kaleda's artistic talents became apparent in high school. With encouragement from a teacher, his early work led to a scholarship to Pratt Institute in Brooklyn. He graduated with honors in 1988.

After college, Kaleda took a job compositing photographic proofs for a company that manufactured retouching stations. Surrounded by state-of-the-art computers and graphics hardware, he was drawn to the technology. It was here that mixing the science of computers with the art of painting first entered his mind. Although he continued to paint traditionally, in 1993 Kaleda purchased his first computer and began experimenting.

During the mid-1990s, the exponential growth of the internet began to have a significant influence on Kaleda and the relationship between humanity, technology and the internet became a primary focus in his work.

By 1997, Kaleda was working as a pre-press technician for an established New York City printing firm. Within five years, he had taught himself Adobe Photoshop, Illustrator and Corel Painter, and expanded his skills into photo retouching and color correction for fashion catalogues. While these skills served him in his commercial work, they also became additional tools for his painting. His work evolved into mixed media, combining manipulated digital images printed on canvas with spray paint and solvents.

During the next four years, Kaleda’s work shifted again to a new digital approach reflecting a highly refined and unique style. In 2010, Kaleda broke new ground by incorporating QR codes into his work, adding interactivity and multi-dimensionality to his paintings. He continues to live and work in Manhattan.

=== Transition to Digital ===
Witnessing the birth and growth of the digital age had a profound effect on Kaleda’s work as an artist. While his formal art training was grounded in tradition, a parallel path developed involving the creation of art with the computer. As advancing technology transformed the social, political and economic landscape, Kaleda’s work progressed from mixed media to all digital:

“I saw the world become more connected on a global level, but increasingly isolated on an individual level. And within the terrifyingly vast landscape known as the internet, I looked on as an entire culture turned away from face-to-face communication. Intimacy became cybersex, and true identities were replaced by ideal or false personas, yet we still long to connect. These themes emerged in my figurative paintings and continue to inspire my work today.”

Although Kaleda uses software to simulate elements of conventional painting, his technique breaks tradition in many ways, including the use of graphic shapes and patterns as brushes, and creating his own digital models as subjects. Painting with the computer also allows an infinite number of variations with the ability to return to different stages of the process. While technology plays a prominent role in Kaleda’s creations, the human factor remains paramount in both his themes and end results:

“In terms of digital painting in general, the basic process is that I interpret the world and the computer interprets my input. Ultimately, the final decisions are mine. The paradoxical truth is that the power of digital art, and using technology to make art, will always rely on the human element. My work is both an example and an expression of this.”

== Use of QR Codes ==
Kaleda began incorporating QR codes into his paintings in 2010. In addition to blurring the line between art and commodity, these codes serve many different functions within Kaleda’s work. Offering an interactive experience, QR codes provide viewers with additional information to deepen understanding about a given painting. In some instances, the codes serve as a stamp or symbol of authorship – much like a modernized Asian chop or seal (East Asia). One painting called “Fetish” uses the codes themselves as paint brushes. According to Kaleda:

“As a condensed digital representation of information (or a message), these codes have a natural place within the language and fabric of my work.”
