= Rebelle (software) =

Digital painting software

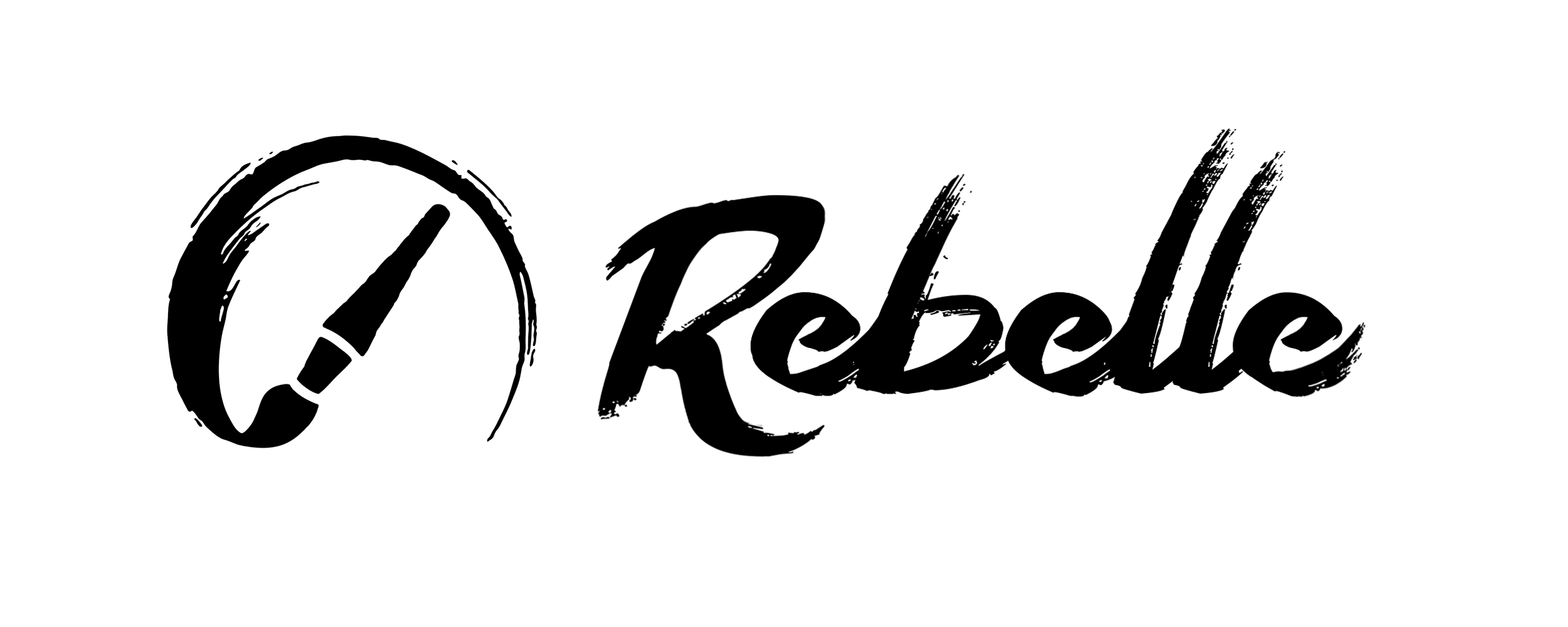

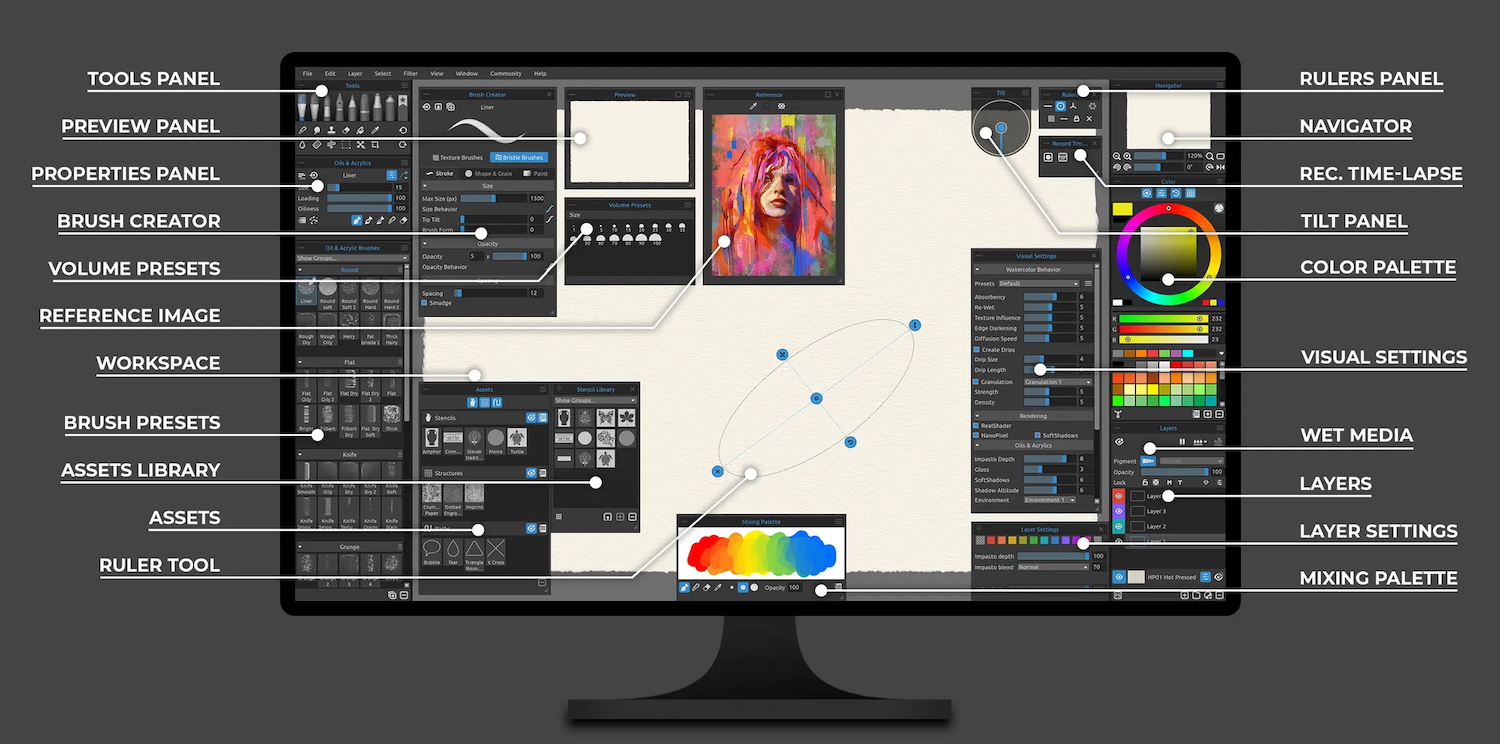
- Rebelle 8 user interface
- Developer: Escape Motions
- Release: 28 May 2015
- Stable release: 8.2.2 / January 30, 2026; 9 months ago
- Written in: C++, Qt
- Operating system: Windows, macOS
- Type: Raster graphics editor
- License: Proprietary, Perpetual
- Website: www.escapemotions.com/products/rebelle/about

Rebelle is a raster graphics editor for digital painting and drawing that simulates oils, acrylics, watercolors, pencils and other traditional paint media on a digital canvas. Developed and published by the Slovak company Escape Motions, the software was intended for a wide range of users from children to professionals. It was first released in 2015.

Rebelle’s paint engine simulates various types of wet and dry media. The oil thickness and watercolor diffusion emulate how natural media interact with each other and with the canvas.

On first release in 2015, Escape Motions presented it at the SIGGRAPH conference’s 2016 Appy Hour where independent app developers introduce their apps.

The current version is Rebelle 8, released in Early Access in July 2025, followed by the full release in October 2025. It is available in Standard edition and also Pro, which includes additional features: bristle brushes, RealShader with SoftShadows, pigment color mixing, NanoPixel technology, smooth scaling, metallic materials, Advanced PSD import & export, Photoshop plugin, color management, fractal image resizing, WebSocket control input and Motion IO.

Rebelle is compatible with Windows and MacOS and is designed to be used with a tablet PC or graphics tablet, but it can be used with a computer mouse.

== Tools and features ==
Rebelle includes wet media tools: oils, acrylics, watercolors, ink pens, and dry tools: pastels, pencils, charcoals, markers, and airbrushes. Other tools are blend, smudge, liquify, clone, fill, water, dry, blow, color picker, tilt, transform tools, selection tools, and more.

Rebelle includes different types of customizable brushes with various brush textures. It offers multiple paper surfaces that serve as a background for the painting and dynamically interact with the painting tools. The software has a touch gesture system for touch and multitouch displays, which supports simultaneous zooming, rotating, and panning.

=== List of main features ===
List of main features
| Painting tools | Other tools and features |
|---|---|
| Oils, Acrylics, Express Oils, Watercolors, Inks, Pencils, Markers, Pastels, Airbrushes | Smudge, Blend, Liquify, Clone, Eraser, Fill, Pick color, Water tool, Dry tool, Blow tool, Selection, Transform, Warp, Deform, Perspective, Canvas resize, Image resize, Crop image, Layers, Image tracing, Masking fluid, Layer masks, Clipping masks, Filter layers, Gradient maps, Reference Images, Filters, Grids, Guides, Line, Ellipse and Perspective tools, Tilt with accelerometer, Stencils, Mixing Palette, Timelapse recording, Color management, Vector paths, Structures, Symmetry |

== Technology ==
=== Watercolor and wet media simulation, DropEngine ===
Rebelle’s watercolor simulation is built upon real-world color mixing, blending, moistening, and drying. The fluid simulation is based on Navier-Stokes equations to simulate the realistic fluid flow occurring in nature. Watercolor simulation in Rebelle is an extensive sandbox that consists internally of multiple layers, used to calculate the water and paint simulation, wetting, drying, and re-wetting already dried colors. Users can paint, erase, blend, and smear the painting, tilt the canvas to create water drops, and various watercolor effects, which are calculated in real-time. The simulation offers a realistic granulation effect as the paint dries into the paper.

=== Thick paint and impasto ===
Rebelle supports laying down thick layers of paint and lets users control the impasto depth of oils and acrylics. Creating thick or thin layers is possible with the Impasto engine, which uses a height map of the painting's structure.

Rebelle 8 introduced significant changes to the way impasto effects are rendered within the software. The update features a system called RealShader, described as a new generation of Rebelle materials that utilize real photographs as environment maps. These environment maps are employed for image-based lighting, resulting in more realistic light interactions on raised paint surfaces.

In addition to RealShader, Rebelle 8 includes a SoftShadows setting, which allows raised brushstrokes to cast ray-traced shadows. This enhancement provides a greater sense of depth and three-dimensionality to digital paint textures.

=== Bristle brushes ===
Rebelle’s bristle brushes are a category of digital brushes introduced in Rebelle 8 that simulate the behavior of natural hog-bristle paintbrushes through a particle-based brush engine. Each stroke behaves like a real brush, with individual hairs spreading, blending, and picking up pigment naturally. Unlike earlier texture-based brushes, the system models and renders individual brush strands, allowing each hair to respond independently to pressure, smudging, and color during a stroke. This approach enables more natural variation, depth, and impasto effect.

=== Pigment color mixing ===
Rebelle 5 released in December 2021 introduced physical color mixing based on traditional pigments. It produces saturated gradients with hue shifts and natural secondary colors during blending. As a result of this colors mixing model, colors mix realistically, e.g. yellow and blue colors make green color. The implementation is based on the Mixbox model developed by Secret Weapons. Their paper Practical Pigment Mixing for Digital Painting developed a mixing approach that rectifies the behavior of colors by leveraging the Kubelka–Munk model and was accepted for Siggraph talk in 2021.

=== NanoPixel ===
Rebelle 5 Pro introduced technology for resizing paintings and canvases in real time called NanoPixel. The technology is based on machine-learning algorithms, especially deep learning and it allows exporting 16x larger paintings. NanoPixel depends on GPU power and OpenGL for rendering the painting.

=== Fractal image processing ===
Rebelle 6 Pro released in December 2022 brings the image recognition machine learning algorithm for keeping the image quality and sharp details when using the Warp and Liquify tools, transforming and deforming layers or objects on the canvas.

=== Metallic materials ===
Rebelle 7 Pro features Metallic materials. They work with the Oil & Acrylics tool, making it possible to mimic the look of real-world metallic paints. Users can control the look of materials with various settings.

=== Photoshop plugin ===
Rebelle Pro offers a Photoshop plugin called Escape Motions Connect. It is a JSX file that can be installed into Photoshop as a panel and allows the exporting of layers between Rebelle and Photoshop. The plugin is compatible with Photoshop CC 2015 and newer.

=== Papers and art surfaces ===
Rebelle introduced a new approach to how the background in digital painting software reacts to the paint by developing art surfaces based on real-world papers. This includes hot-pressed, cold-pressed, rough papers, canvases, washi, handmade, and watercolor papers of all kinds that can influence how the paint reacts to the surface. Version 7 featured rendering based on ray tracing which made it possible for the paint to react to the actual bumps and irregular heights of the paper textures.

== Versions ==
The current version is Rebelle 8 and is available in two editions: Rebelle standard and Rebelle Pro which includes everything from standard edition plus additional Pro features: Bristle brushes, RealShader with SoftShadows, Pigment color mixing, NanoPixel technology, Smooth scaling, Metallic materials, Advanced PSD import & export, Photoshop plugin, Color management, Fractal image resizing, WebSocket control input and Motion IO.

=== Free trial version ===
A 30-day free trial version is available on the developer’s website.

=== Version history ===
Rebelle has undergone several iterations since its initial release, with each version introducing new features and improvements.

==== Rebelle beta 0.5.0–0.8.6 ====
Rebelle desktop application was released for pre-purchase as a public beta in April 2015 for Windows and macOS and included notable features: watercolor simulation, painting tools (paint brush, wet brush, dry brush, smear brush, blend brush, tilt canvas), color palettes with custom colors and color picker, various paper textures, 23 layer blending modes, and tablet support.

==== Rebelle 1.0 ====
The first version was released in May 2015 and expanded on its beta predecessors with image import, transform layer tool, and image tracing.

==== Rebelle 2.0 ====
The second major release was launched on April 25th, 2017 and introduced a new brush engine, custom brushes, stencils and masking fluid, selection tools, layered PSD support, and support for multi-touch gestures.

==== Rebelle 3.0 ====
Rebelle 3 was released on May 1, 2018 and featured realistic papers, redesign of the watercolor simulation code, DropEngine, "Masking Fluid" layer, Straight line, Ruler, Perspective tools, "Reference Image", and "Preview" panel.

==== Rebelle 4.0 ====
Rebelle 4 version was released on December 16th, 2020 and introduced Oils, revised Watercolors and watercolor simulation, wet & dry media mixing, performance optimizations, color management, layer groups, clone and fill tool, support for pen tilt, brush line stabilization and improved Brush Creator.

==== Rebelle 5.0 ====
Rebelle 5 was released on December 16, 2021 and introduced two editions - the standard which brought tools like multicolored & dirty brush, express oils, volume presets & curve editors, color Mixing Palette, time-lapse recording and full-color papers and Pro edition that in addition offered Pigments color mixing, NanoPixel technology and Photoshop plug-in.

==== Rebelle 6.0 ====
Rebelle 6 was launched on December 15, 2022 and included a lot of new tools such as liquify and warp tools, clipping and layer masks, grid & guides, reference image guides, favorite brushes, stroke length slider, upgraded brush creator, improved pencils and pastels, new image filters and color range, light and dark interface theme. The Pro edition featured Fractal Image Processing for Transform, Liquify and Canvas Size tools for keeping the best quality for image transformations and deformations using a machine-learning algorithm.

==== Rebelle 7.0 ====
Rebelle 7 was released on December 14, 2023. It included new features: Metallic materials, improved paper and art surfaces, structures, paths, gradients, or Filter layers. Rebelle 7 becomes natively compatible with Apple M chips.

==== Rebelle 8.0 ====
Rebelle 8 was released in July 2025 in Early Access. It included new features: Bristle brushes, RealShader with SoftShadows, Symmetry tool, Smooth scaling, View at print size, advanced PSD import and export, or Color harmonies. Rebelle 8 officially exited its Early Access phase with the release of Rebelle 8.1 in October 2025. This marked the full public launch of the software, following a period of testing and user feedback during Early Access. The 8.1 version includes performance improvements, bug fixes, and additional refinements based on user input collected during the development phase.

== System requirements ==
Rebelle has full 64-bit support on Windows and MacOS.

Minimum system requirements are Intel i5 or equivalent AMD processor, 4 GB RAM, 1,5 GB hard disk space, a graphics card with 1 GB RAM (OpenGL 3.3 required for Rebelle Pro), Windows 10 (64-bit) or Mac OS X 10.15.

Recommended system requirements are Intel i7 (6th gen or newer), equivalent AMD processor, or Apple Silicon (M-series) chip, 16 GB RAM, 1,5 GB hard disk space, a graphics card with 2 GB RAM: NVIDIA gtx760 for FullHD, NVIDIA gtx1060 for 4K screen, or equivalent graphics card, Windows 10 (64-bit) or Mac OS 11 and newer.

== Supported file types ==
The native format is .REB, which keeps all information about the layers and settings. Images can be exported to the following formats: PNG, JPEG, BMP, TIFF, WebP, and Adobe Photoshop's PSD format.

Supported file types
| Exported file type | Layers | Transparency |
|---|---|---|
| JPEG | No | No |
| PNG | No | Yes |
| BMP | No | No |
| TIFF | No | Yes |
| WebP | No | Yes |
| PSD | Yes | Yes |
| REB (native) | Yes | Yes |

== Reception ==
Rebelle has garnered praise from artists and critics alike for its realistic simulation of traditional painting techniques. Its ability to mimic the behavior of oil, watercolor and other media has earned it a reputation as one of the leading digital painting software options for artists. Creative Bloq named Rebelle as the best affordable painting software. TechRadar included Rebelle on the list of the best digital art and drawing software of 2024. The software has been used by professional artists and hobbyists alike to create a wide range of artwork, from illustrations and concept art to fine art pieces.

== Escape Motions ==
Escape Motions is a Slovak-based software development company specializing in graphics software for artists of all levels.

Escape Motions developed other graphics software: Flame Painter for painting with particle brushes, Amberlight for creating abstract art and animations, and Inspirit for creating mandalas. The software is compatible with Windows and macOS, Flame Painter and Inspirit were also developed as standalone apps for the iOS platform.

== See also ==
- Computer graphics
- Comparison of raster graphics editors
- Digital art
- Digital painting
- Graphic art software
- Krita
