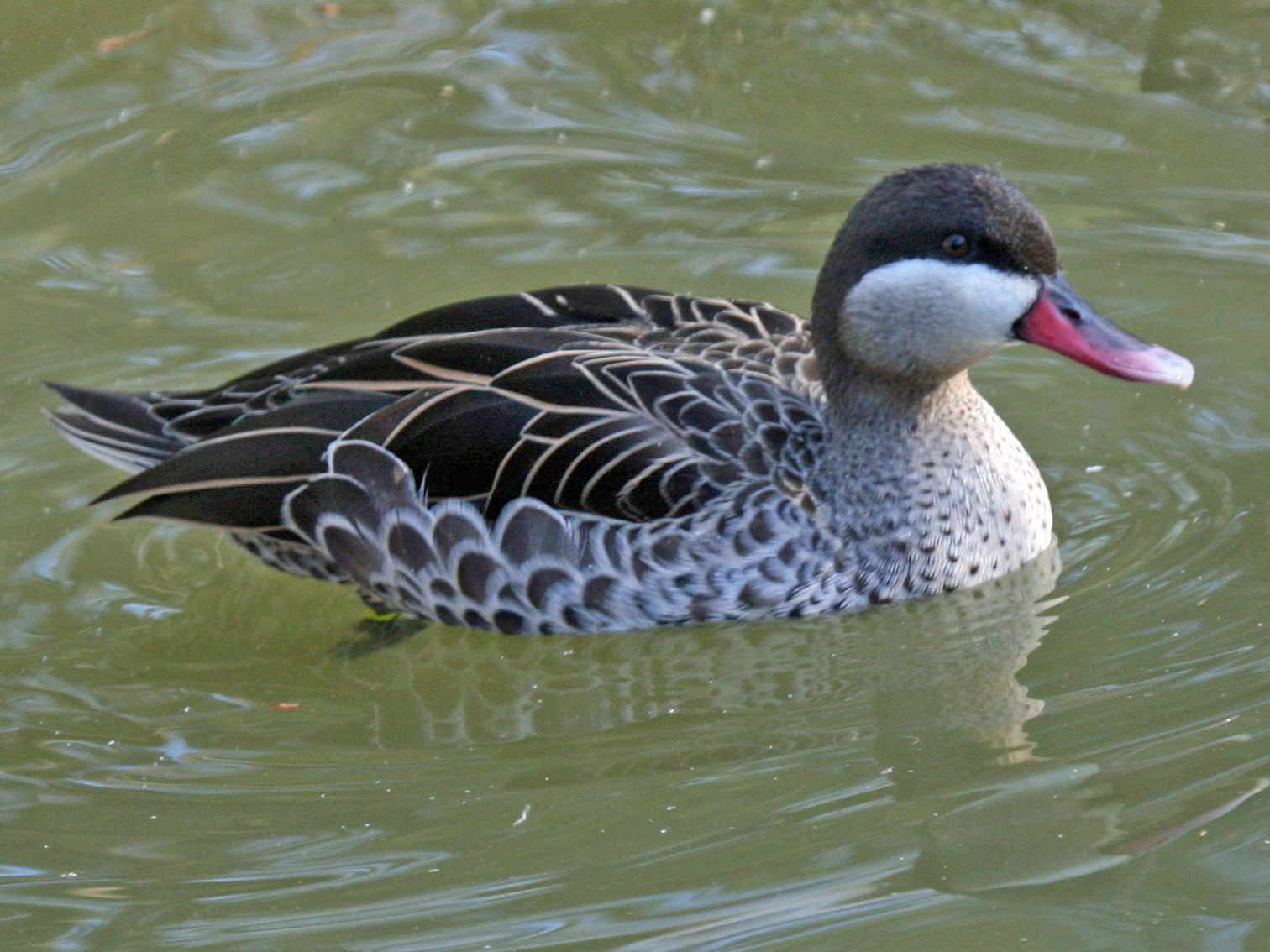
- Male

Conservation status
- Least Concern (IUCN 3.1)

Scientific classification
- Kingdom: Animalia
- Phylum: Chordata
- Class: Aves
- Order: Anseriformes
- Family: Anatidae
- Genus: Anas
- Species: A. erythrorhyncha

Binomial name
- Anas erythrorhyncha Gmelin, JF, 1789

= Red-billed teal =

Species of bird

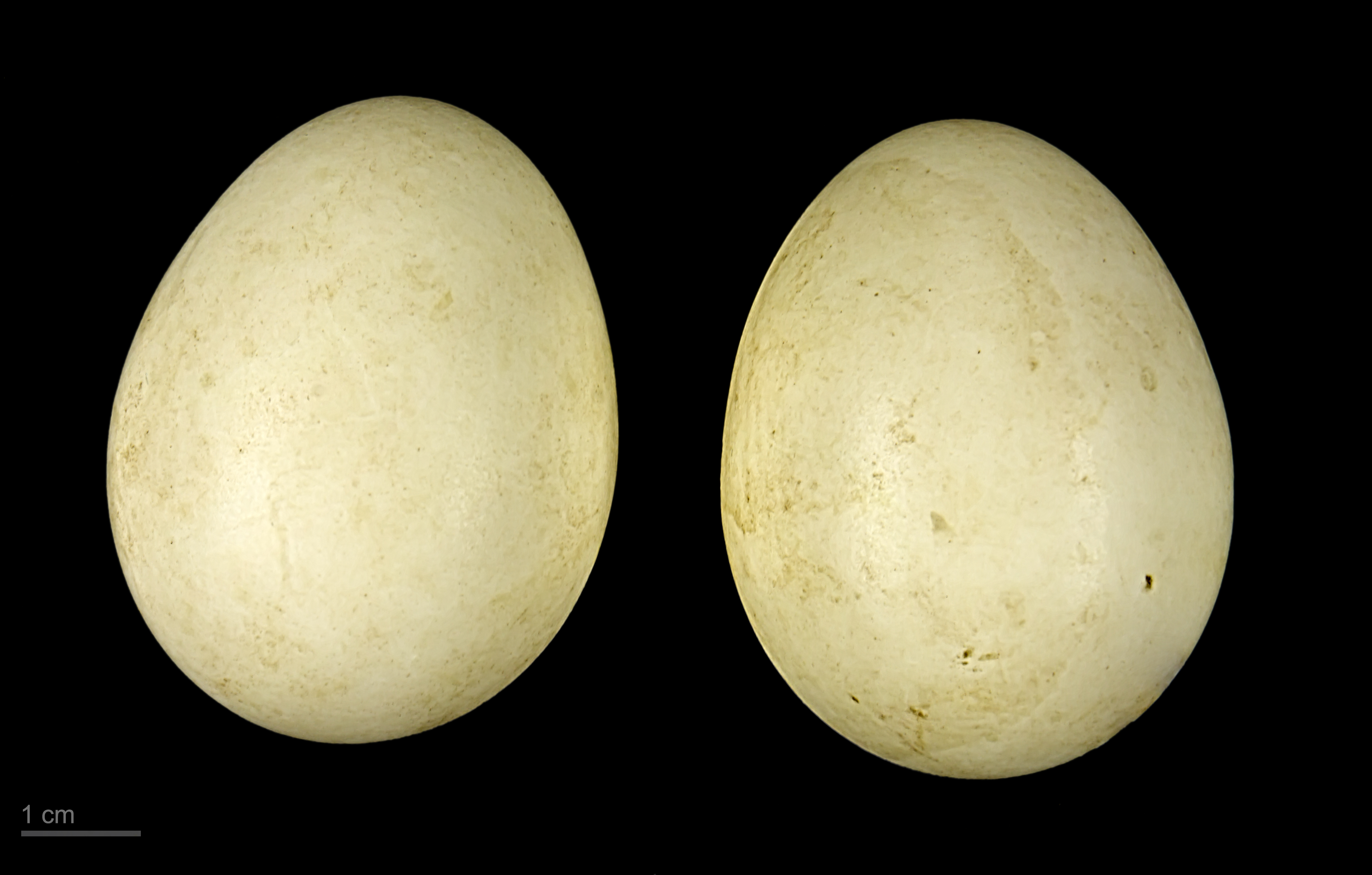
Anas erythrorhyncha – MHNT

The red-billed teal or red-billed duck (Anas erythrorhyncha) is a dabbling duck which is an abundant resident breeder in southern and eastern Africa. typically south of 10° S. This duck is not migratory, but flies great distances to find suitable waters. It is highly gregarious outside the breeding season and forms large flocks.

== Taxonomy ==
The red-billed teal was formally described in 1789 by German naturalist Johann Friedrich Gmelin in his revised and expanded edition of Carl Linnaeus's Systema Naturae. He placed it with all the other ducks, geese, and swans in the genus Anas and coined the binomial name Anas erythrorhyncha. Gmelin based his description on the "crimson-billed duck" that had been described in 1785 by English ornithologist John Latham in his A General Synopsis of Birds. Latham specied the type locality as the Cape of Good Hope. The genus name Anas is the Latin word for a duck. The specific epithet erythrorhyncha combines the Ancient Greek eruthros meaning "red" with rhunkhos meaning "bill". The species is monotypic: no subspecies are recognised.

== Description ==
The red-billed teal is 43–48 cm (17–19 in) long and has a blackish cap and nape, contrasting pale face, and bright red bill. The body plumage is a dull dark brown scalloped with white. Flight reveals that the secondary flight feathers are buff with a black stripe across them. The sexes are similar, but juveniles are duller than adults.

This is a quiet species, but the displaying male has a whzzt call, whereas the female has a soft mallard-like quack.

The red-billed teal is a bird of freshwater habitats in fairly open country and is an omnivore. It feeds by dabbling for plant food or foraging on land, mainly in the evening or at night. It nests on the ground in dense vegetation near water.

This is one of the species to which the Agreement on the Conservation of African-Eurasian Migratory Waterbirds applies.
