= Dabbling =

Dabbling may refer to:

- Engaging in a regular activity that is done for enjoyment, typically during one's leisure time, i.e. a hobby
- Tinkering, the construction or creation of a work from a diverse range of things that happen to be available
- Dabbling ducks, which feed mainly at the surface rather than by diving
- "Dabbling" (The Vice), a 1999 episode of the ITV police drama

== See also ==
- Dabble – Word game
- Dabbler – Drawing software by Corel
