= Digital illustration =

Use of digital tools to produce images under an artist's direction

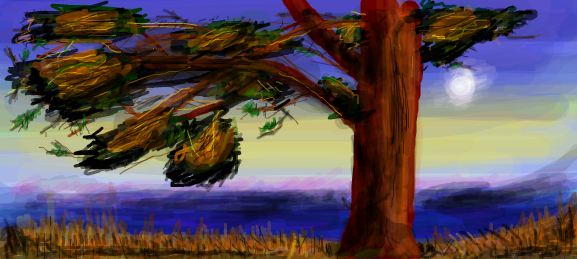
A digital illustration depicting a tree in autumn, drawn using Facebook's "graffiti" app

Digital illustration or computer illustration is the use of digital tools to produce images under the direct manipulation of the artist, usually through a pointing device such as a graphics tablet or, less commonly, a mouse. It is distinguished from computer-generated art, which is produced by a computer using mathematical models created by the artist. It is also distinct from digital manipulation of photographs, in that it is an original construction "from scratch". Photographic elements such as background or texture may be incorporated into such works, but they are not necessarily the primary basis.

== Pointing devices ==
Mice are not very precise for drawing, so a graphics tablet is often an important tool for most digital illustrators, because it allows the user to make a mark easily in any direction, in a way that reflects the natural or "lively" line made by the human hand. In addition to flexibility of movement, an industry-standard digital drawing tablet has a pressure-sensitive surface, allowing the illustrator to make marks that vary from faint to bold, and from thin to broad, similar to how one would work with a brush. These variations mimic traditional wet and dry media. A hybrid graphics tablet/screen might be helpful, since the artist can see more accurately where to place strokes in the image, but the hardware is currently much more expensive.

== Illustration software ==
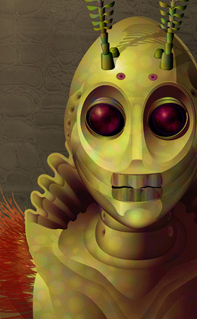
Example of an original vector drawing in Adobe Illustrator. Note the precise edges of shapes and even width of lines that are typical of a drawing program.

There are two main types of tools used for digital illustration: bitmapped (also known as "raster") and vector applications. Bitmap applications are commonly called "painting" programs, such as Adobe Photoshop, while vector applications, such as Adobe Illustrator, are called "drawing" programs. These terms reflect the difference in look-and-feel between the images created in each type of program. With a bitmap application, the content is stored digitally in fixed rows and columns of pixels, which can be created in separate layers for more easily isolating and manipulating different parts of the image. A bitmap image contains information about each pixel's hue (color), luminance (brightness), and saturation (intensity of color). When the pointing device moves over an area of the image, new colors and values are applied to the underlying pixels. Painting tools allow the easy creation of "fuzzy" imagery, including effects such as glows and soft shadows, and textures such as fur, velvet, stone and skin, and are heavily used in photo-retouching.

With vector-based tools, the content is stored digitally as resolution-independent mathematical formulae describing lines (open paths), shapes (closed paths), and color fills, strokes or gradients. Vector paths are constructed of anchor points and path segments by using the pointing device to click and drag. Many vector graphics are readily available for download from online databases which can then be edited and incorporated into larger projects. Drawing tools typically create precise lines, shapes and patterns with well-defined edges and are superb for working with complex constructions such as maps and typography. Digital illustrations may include both raster and vector graphics in the same work. A bitmap image file may be saved in a format which embeds a layer of vector information, and a vector image file may include imported bitmap images.

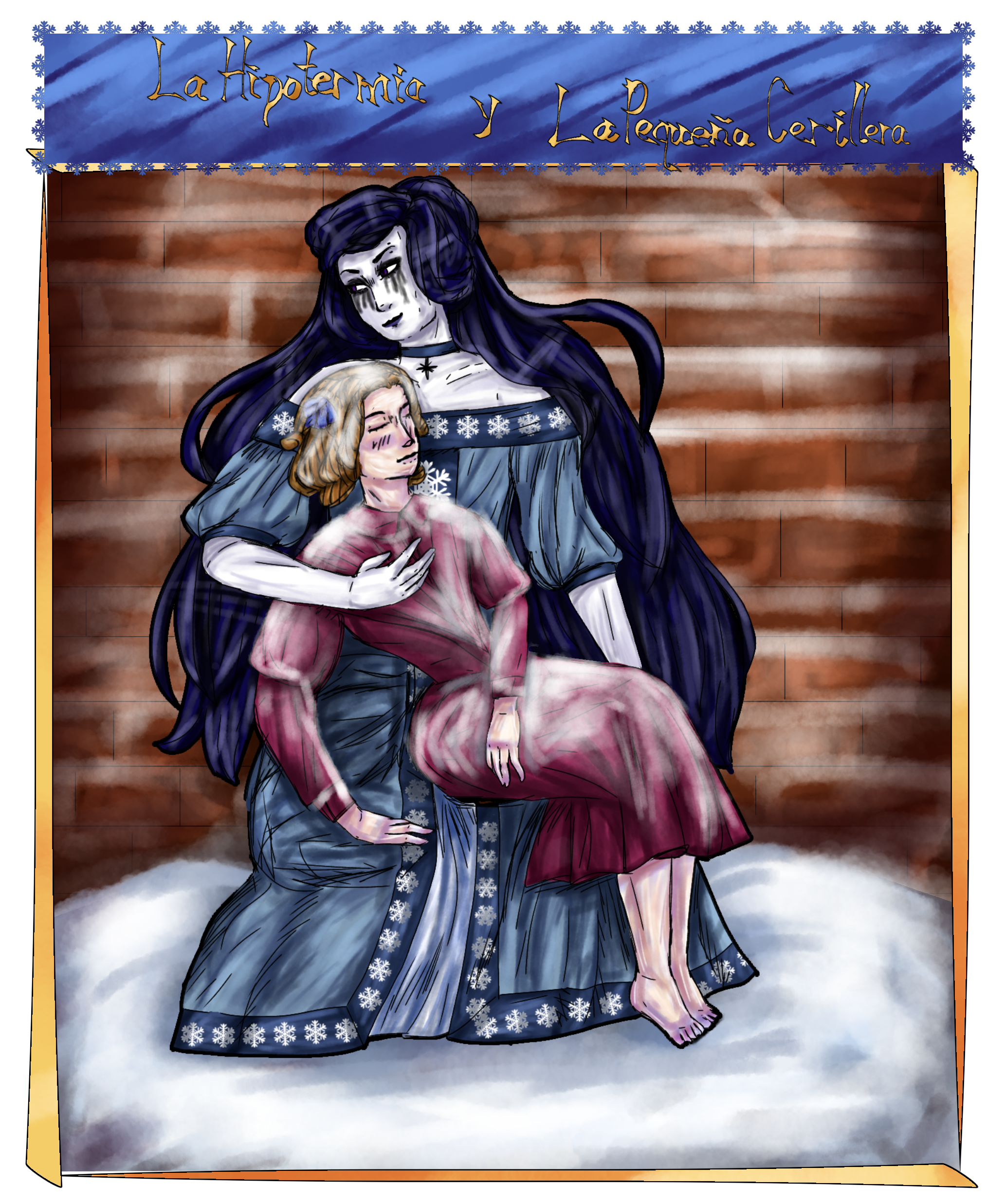
Example of a digital illustration made on a mobile phone and personification art. The illustration shows The Little Match Girl with a personification of Hypothermia.

Since the development of touchscreen mobile devices, various digital illustration softwares are available on mobile phones, making digital illustration more accessible and affordable. Mobile illustration softwares have allowed a broader range of artists to get into digital drawing and painting.

== Digital techniques ==
Photobashing is a technique commonly used by concept artists. The process involves the artist merging and blending photographs and/or 3D assets while painting to composite a final art piece. This technique is very similar to the process of compositing in video editing. This technique is commonly used by concept artists to help increase their productivity with higher accuracy.

Vector art is a form of digital graphics constructed using mathematical equations that define lines, curves, and geometric shapes. Specialized software such as Adobe Illustrator and Inkscape is commonly used to produce vector-based images. A key advantage of vector graphics is their ability to be scaled to any size without loss of quality, making them suitable for logos, illustrations, and various web design elements. The use of anchor points and Bézier curves allows for precise control over shapes, resulting in smooth, clean, and easily scalable artwork.

== See also ==
- Graphic art software
- Graphic design
- Graphics software
- Icon design
