= Procreate (software) =

Raster graphics editing app

- Developer: Savage Interactive
- Release: March 16, 2011; 15 years ago
- Stable release: 5.4.12 (iPad); 4.0.18 (Pocket) / July 27, 2026; 3 months ago (iPad); July 28, 2026; 3 months ago (Pocket)
- Operating system: iOS 15.4.1 or later; iPadOS 15.4.1 or later
- Platform: iPad Pro (all versions); iPad Air (2nd gen or later); iPad Mini (4th gen or later); iPad (5th gen or later); iPhone
- Available in: 13 languages
- List of languages English (United States), English (United Kingdom), English (Australia), Arabic, Chinese (Simplified), Chinese (Traditional), French, German, Hindi, Indonesian, Italian, Japanese, Korean, Malay, Polish, Portuguese, Russian, Spanish, Thai, Turkish.
- Type: Raster graphics editor
- License: Proprietary
- Website: procreate.com

Procreate is a raster graphics editor and a drawing app for digital painting developed and published by the Australian company Savage Interactive for iOS and iPadOS. It was launched on the App Store in 2011.

== Versions ==
=== Procreate ===
An example of a picture created in Procreate, preloaded on the app

Procreate for iPad was first released in 2011 by the Tasmanian software company Savage Interactive. In June 2013, Savage launched Procreate 2 in conjunction with iOS 7, adding new features such as higher resolution capabilities and more brush options.

In 2016, Procreate became one of the top ten best-selling iPad apps on the App Store. In 2018, Procreate became the overall best selling iPad app.

With iOS 26, Procreate adapted Liquid Glass into its software.

As of March 2026, the most recent version of Procreate for the iPad is 5.4.9.

=== Procreate Pocket ===
Procreate Pocket is a raster graphics editor and drawing app designed for iPhone.

Procreate Pocket was released to the App Store in December 2014.

In 2018, Savage launched Procreate Pocket 2.0 to the App Store.

In December 2018, Procreate Pocket received Apple's "App of the Year" award.

As of September 2025, the most recent version of Procreate Pocket (for the iPhone) is 4.0.15.

In October 2026, Procrate Pocket adapted its software with Liquid Glass with iOS 27 and following days before the launch of the iPhone Duo.

=== Procreate Dreams ===
Procreate Dreams, their more recent app focused on 2D animation, was released on the App Store on November 22, 2023.

While the application is commended for its intuitive interface and accessibility, some reviewers have noted that it may lack some key animations features, such as reference layers.

In June 2024, Procreate Dreams received the 2024 Apple Design Award for Innovation.

In December 2025, Savage Interactive released Procreate Dreams 2, a long awaited update and redesign to Procreate Dreams.

== Features ==
The current versions of Procreate use Valkyrie, a proprietary graphics engine to allow customisable brush options and importing brushes from Adobe Photoshop. Procreate offers known features like layers, masks, and blending mode. Its biggest standout compared to other professional drawing software is its simple UI and comparatively easy learning curve.

The app also allows for animation. Savage expanded upon Procreate's animation features with a companion app dedicated to 2D animation called Procreate Dreams, released in November 2023.

On August 2024, Procreate announced that it would not be incorporating generative artificial intelligence into its software. Savage offers a free internet forum called Procreate Discussions in which users can ask for help, suggest ideas, and share user-generated content on the marketplace or the resources board.

== Notable users ==
Concept artist Doug Chiang creates robot, vehicle, and creature designs for Star Wars in Procreate.

Professional artists have also used Procreate to create the posters for Stranger Things, Logan, and Blade Runner 2049, as well as several covers for The New Yorker. It has also been professionally adopted at Marvel Comics, DC Comics, Disney Animation, and Pixar.

== See also ==
- Digital art
- Digital painting
- Graphic art software
- Raster graphics
- Comparison of raster graphics editors
