= Sketcher =

Natural media graphics software

Sketcher was one of the earliest "natural media" raster graphics software applications. It was released in the early 1990s by the US company Fractal Design Corporation for the Apple Macintosh and for Windows 3.0 in 1992.

This software simulated the behavior of various types of paper and art materials such as chalk, pastels, pencils and brushes.

Even though color Macintoshes existed at the time, it ran in grayscale. A rationale for this may be that, while color support existed in the computer, large grayscale monitors were considerably less expensive than color ones, with color sometimes costing three times as much for an equivalent size display. Likewise, Sketcher sold for a lower price than Painter ($99 vs. $299)

Not to discount what was stated above, an advantage of Sketcher being in grayscale, was that it required less memory to run than Painter. Under Windows, it only required 4 megabytes of RAM, where as Painter required a minimum of 8 megabytes of RAM.

Following Sketcher, Fractal Design added color support, new features, modified the interface somewhat and released Dabbler. Sketcher was discontinued shortly afterwards.

== See also ==
- List of raster graphics editors
- Comparison of raster graphics editors
