= Brain painting =

Artwork controlled by non-muscular brain activity

Brain painting is a non-invasive P300-based brain-computer interface (BCI) that allows painting without the use of muscular activity. The technology combines electroencephalography, signal processing algorithms and visual stimulation on a monitor to detect where the user focuses his attention, allowing him to voluntarily trigger commands to a painting software. The research project aims at assisting people afflicted with the Locked-in syndrome due to neurological or neuromuscular disease (e.g. amyotrophic lateral sclerosis ALS), who are severely restricted in communication with their environment, and therefore cut off from the possibility of creative expression.

== History ==
Brain painting was co-developed by Andrea Kübler from the University of Würzburg (Germany) and Adi Hoesle. After development and testing, Brain Painting first appeared in 2010 to general press and to scientific press with a report of evaluation on healthy and locked-in participants

Supported since 2012 by the EU project "BackHome" (FP7-ICT-288566), the BCI has been adapted for independent home use, and installed at locked-in artist's home: Heide Pfützner in 2012 and Jürgen Thiele in 2013. Long-term evaluation by a locked-in end user showed good satisfaction towards the system. After successful crowdfunding support, the artist Heide Pfüztner had an exhibition in summer 2013 in Easdale, Scotland, and from July to December 2014 in Würzburg (Germany)
