= Sketchbook (software) =

Digital drawing and sketching app

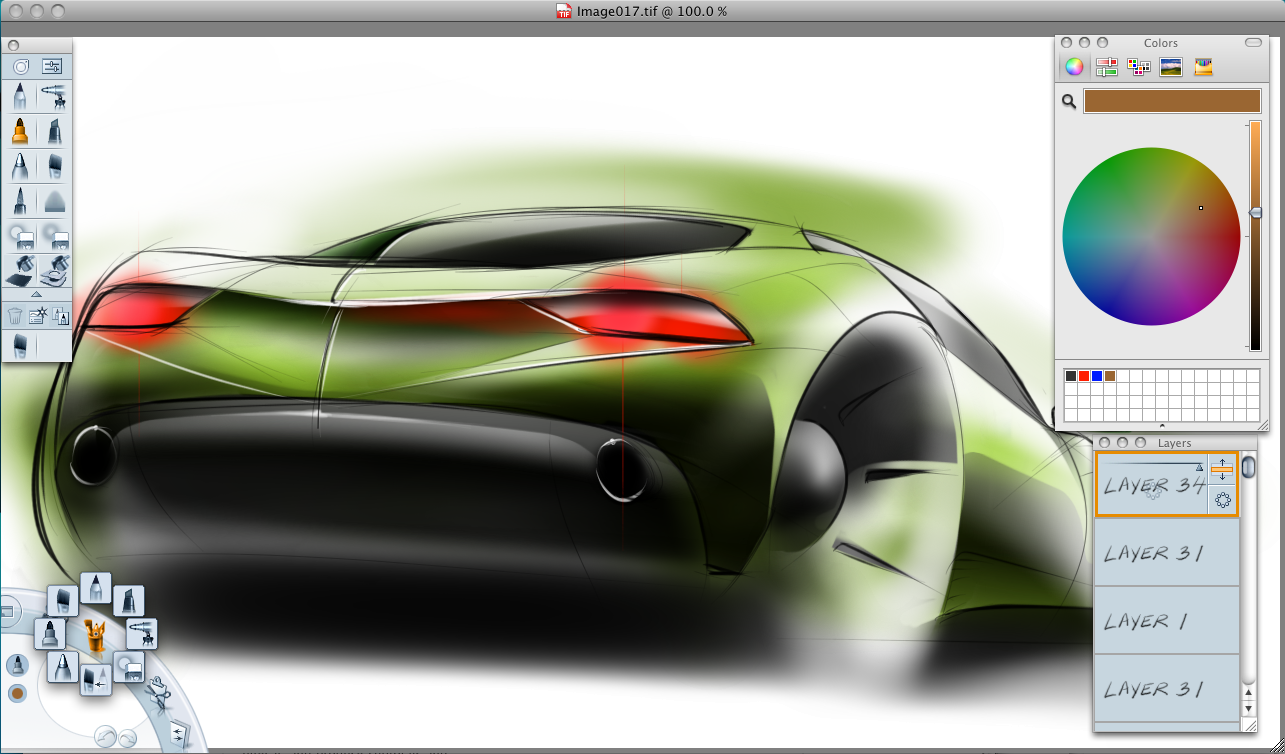
- Autodesk SketchBook Pro in 2009 running on Apple Mac OS X
- Stable release: 9.0.26 (Windows), 9.0.25 (Mac), 6.0.4 (Android), 6.0.5 (iOS) / July 27, 2023; 2 years ago
- Operating system: macOS, Microsoft Windows, Android, iOS
- Type: Raster graphics editor
- License: Proprietary
- Website: sketchbook.com

Sketchbook (formerly StudioPaint, also referred to as Autodesk SketchBook) is a raster graphics software app intended for expressive drawing and concept sketching, as well as animations. The software was first developed by Alias Systems Corporation as StudioPaint, before being acquired by Autodesk and then being spun out into an independent company, Sketchbook, Inc. Originally developed as commercial software, it evolved into a subscription model before eventually being made freeware for personal use. In 2021, Sketchbook Pro, the desktop version of the app available on Microsoft Windows and macOS, became a paid software available through the Microsoft Store and Mac App Store.

== Features ==
Sketchbook features a radial/pie-menu user interface and has painting and drawing tools such as pencils, markers, and brushes. It uses pressure-sensitive features of digital drawing pads, tablet computers, and smartphones to create effects similar to traditional materials. A screenshot tool is also included for annotations, allowing one to show content during meetings, and to add notes for review. The program can also create flipbooks or animations, and it supports layers with the ability to import from and export to Adobe Photoshop (.psd) format. Among other features are rulers, brush customization, and canvas rotation.

== Versions ==
When Autodesk acquired Alias in October 2005, they slowed down Sketchbook Pro development for a time. Version 2.0 was released in July 2005, under Alias Systems Corporation.

A beta version of version 3.0 was shown at MacWorld 2008 on display with the Axiotron Modbook. In April 2008, Autodesk SketchBook Pro 2009 was released to the public, followed by SketchBook Pro 2010, a year later. Autodesk continued to have a beta program for testing new versions of SketchBook Pro.

There was a limited consumer version of Sketchbook Pro - SketchBook Express, which provides much of the same functionality as Pro, but does not include brush customization, layer controls, symmetric brushes, or guide lines. Earlier versions of Express could not save layers. Versions 5.5 and later, however, do allow the preservation of layers.

On September 17, 2009, SketchBook Mobile was released, initially for Apple's iPhone and iPod Touch. Built with the same paint engine as Pro, Mobile (and its free version, Mobile Express) offers many of the same design features seen in the desktop application. Android versions of both SketchBook Mobile and Express were to be later released on November 30, 2010.

In August 2012, SketchBook Pro 6 was released, marking a return to conventional version numbering. Throughout May 2014, another new version of Sketchbook Pro was shown on the software application's website, referred to as SketchBook Pro 2015.

In August 2014, SketchBook 7 was released, and with it, it introduced the current subscription model.

In May 2017, the iOS 4.0 version of SketchBook was released. This update introduces new features; two-hand workflow, an improved quick-access toolbar, and an improved rendering engine.

In April 2018, the full-featured version of Sketchbook was made completely free to all users; the subscription model has been phased out, and all premium features (including perspective guides, flood fill, layer effects, and brush customization) are unlocked. Sketchbook will continue to be offered as a commercial subscription product, under its current incarnation: Sketchbook for Enterprise (this version of Sketchbook includes paid technical support as well as cross-functionality with other Autodesk software).

In June 2021, Autodesk announced SketchBook would spin into an independent company, Sketchbook Inc. led by two former Autodesk SketchBook employees. On the 30th of that month, Sketchbook released an update which made the app unusable for any device using Android 11, causing all saved work to appear deleted and crashes upon opening. This was rectified two days later with an expedited update. It was later announced that Sketchbook Inc. would start charging users of Sketchbook Pro in order to fund the development of the application, however, they would not be using the previous subscription model and instead, charge a one-time payment for the software.

== See also ==
- Fresh Paint
- ArtRage
- List of 2D graphics software
