= Rebelles =

Canadian political magazine

Rebelles was a libertarian socialist periodical published in Canada. The magazine was started in 1993. It was headquartered in Montreal. It was published until 2001. Some of its members founded also another French language publication, Démanarchie.
