= Comparisons of media players =

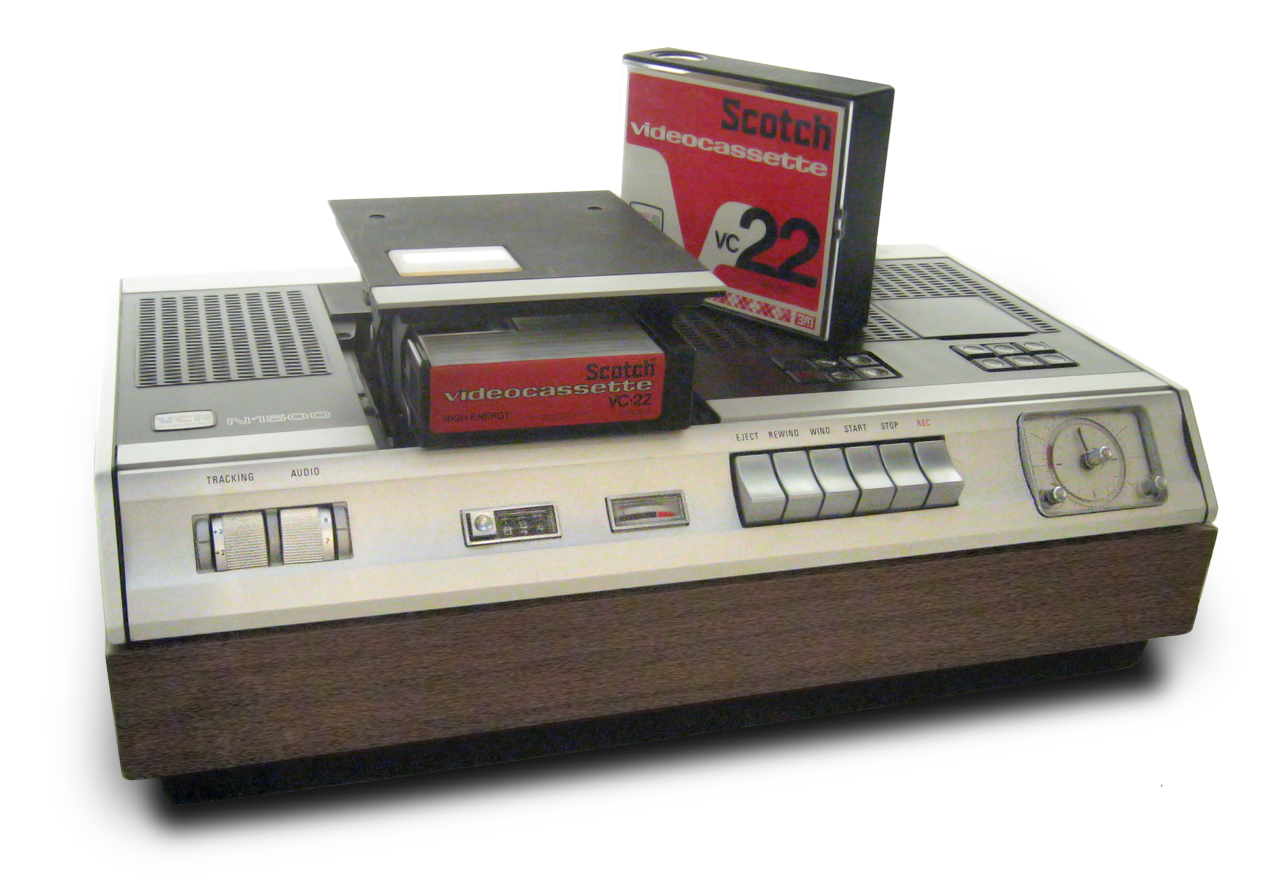
Philips N1500 VCR (1972)

Comparisons of media players are lists of digital media player hardware and software products that compare their features. The lists are organized by medium and other characteristics.

== Hardware ==
- Comparison of digital media players, for digital media players

== Software ==
- Comparison of video player software, for software designed to play all digital media including video
- Comparison of audio player software, for software specialized in playing audio and manage audio libraries
- Comparison of free software for audio#Players
- Comparison of DVR software packages
- List of smart TV platforms
- List of software based on Kodi and XBMC
