= Graphic art software =

Subclass of application software

Graphic software screenshots

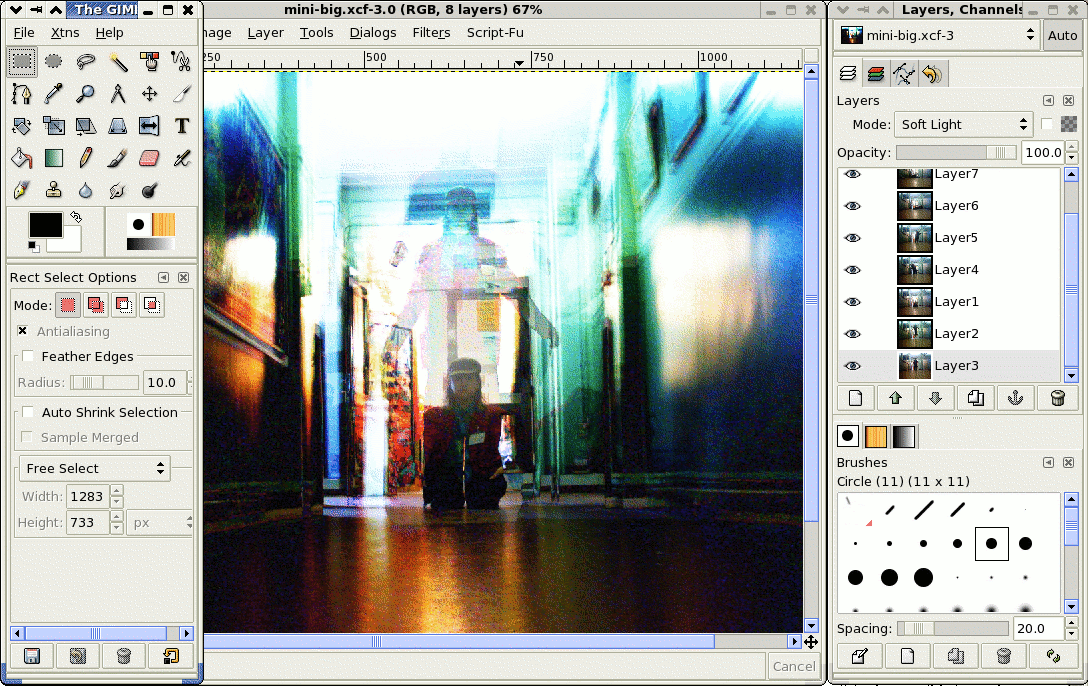
Raster graphics shown via GIMP 2.2.8

Vector graphics shown via Karbon on AEGeAn Linux desktop

Graphic art software is a subclass of application software used for graphic design, multimedia development, stylized image development, technical illustration, general image editing, or simply to access graphic files. Art software uses either raster graphics or vector graphics reading and editing methods to create, edit, and view art.

Many artists and other creative professionals today use personal computers rather than traditional media. Using graphic art software may be more efficient than rendering using traditional media by needing less eye–hand coordination and less mental imaging skill, and using the computer's quicker (sometimes more accurate) automated rendering functions to create images. However, advanced level computer styles, effects and editing methods may need a steeper learning curve of computer technical skills than what was needed to learn traditional hand rendering and mental imaging skills. The potential of the software to enhance or hinder creativity may depend on the intuitiveness of the user interface.

== Specialized software ==
Most art software includes common functions, creation tools, editing tools, filters, and automated rendering modes. Many, however, are designed to enhance a specialized skill or technique. Specialized software packages may be discontinued for various reasons such as lack of appreciation for the result, lack of expertise and training for the product, or simply not worth the time and money investment, but most likely due to obsolescence compared to newer methods or integration as a feature of newer more complete software packages.

=== Graphic design software ===
Graphic design professionals favor general image editing software and page layout software commonly referred to as desktop publishing software. Graphic designers that are also image developers or multimedia developers may use a combination of page layout software with the following:

=== Multimedia development software ===
Multimedia development professionals favor software with audio, motion and interactivity such as software for creating and editing hypermedia, electronic presentations (more specifically slide presentations), computer simulations and games.

=== Stylized image development software ===
Image development professionals may use general graphic editors or may prefer more specialized software for rendering or capturing images with style. Although images can be created from scratch with most art software, specialized software applications or advanced features of generalized applications are used for more accurate visual effects. These visual effects include:

==== Traditional medium effects ====
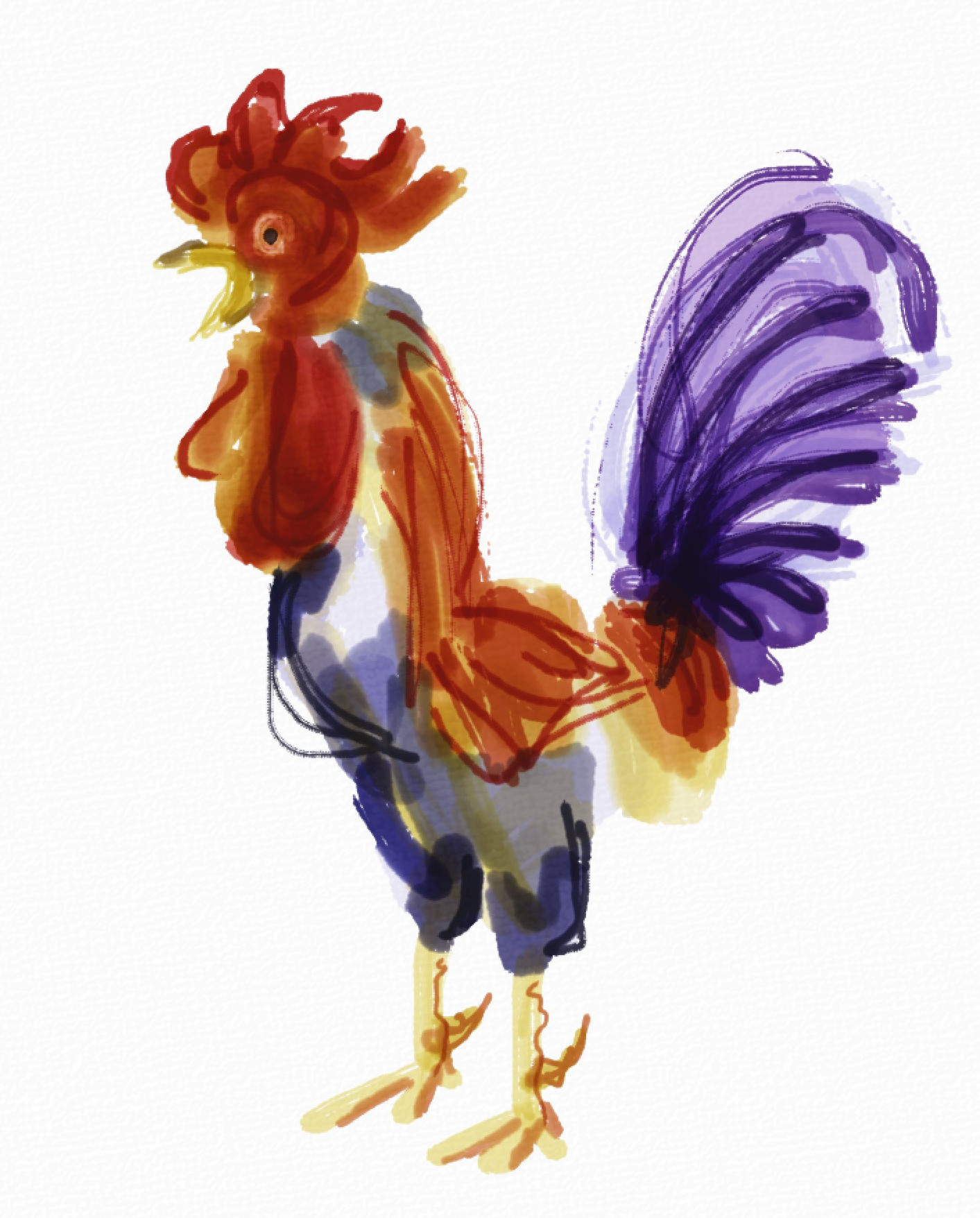
Watercolor painted in Auryn Ink

Vector editors are ideal for solid, crisp lines seen in line art, poster, woodcut ink effects, and mosaic effects.

Some generalized image editors, such as Adobe Photoshop, are used for digital painting (representing real brush and canvas textures such as watercolor or burlap canvas) or handicraft textures such as mosaic or stained glass. However, unlike Adobe Photoshop, which was originally designed for photo editing, software such as Corel Painter and Photo-Paint were originally designed for rendering with digital painting effects and continue to evolve with more emphasis on hand-rendering styles that don't appear computer generated.

==== Photorealistic effects ====
Unlike traditional medium effects, photorealistic effects create the illusion of a photographed image. Specialized software may contain 3D modeling and ray tracing features to make images appear photographed. Some 3D software is for general 3D object modeling, whereas other 3D software is more specialized, such as Poser for characters or Bryce for scenery. Software such as Adobe Photoshop may be used to create 3D effects from 2D (flat) images instead of 3D models. AddDepth is a discontinued software for extruding 2D shapes into 3D images with the option of beveled effects. MetaCreations Detailer and Painter 3D are discontinued software applications specifically for painting texture maps on 3D Models.

==== Hyperrealistic effects ====
Specialized software may be used to combine traditional medium effects and photorealistic effects. 3D modeling software may be exclusively for, include features for, or include the option of 3rd party plugins for rendering 3D models with 2-D effects (e.g. cartoons, illustrations) for hyperrealistic effects. Other 2-D image editing software may be used to trace photographs or rotoscope animations from the film. This allows artists to rapidly apply unique styles to what would be purely photorealistic images from computer generated imagery from 3D models or photographs. Some styles of hyperrealism may need motion visual effects (e.g., geometrically accurate rotation, accurate kinetics, simulated organic growth, lifelike motion constraints) to notice the realism of the imagery. Software may be used to bridge the gap between the imagination and the laws of physics.

=== Technical graphic software ===
Technical professionals and technical illustrators may use technical graphic software that might allow for stylized effects with more emphasis on clarity and accuracy and little or no emphasis on creative expression and aesthetics. For this reason, the results are seldom referred to as "art." For designing or technical illustration of synthetic physical objects, the software is usually referred to as CAD or CADD, Computer-Aided Design and Drafting. This software allows more precise handling of measurements and mathematical calculations, some of which simulate physics to conduct virtual testing of the models. Aside from physical objects, technical graphic software may include software for visualizing concepts, manually representing scientific data, visualizing algorithms, visual instructions, and navigation aids in the form of information graphics. Specialized software for concept maps may be used for both technical purposes and non-technical conceptualizing, which may or may not be considered technical illustration.

=== Specialized graphic format handling ===
This may include software for handling specialized graphic file formats such as Fontographer software, which is dedicated to creating and editing computer fonts. Some general image editing software has unique image file handling features as well. Vector graphic editors handle vector graphic files and are able to load PostScript files natively. Some tools enable professional photographers to use nondestructive image processing for editing digital photography without permanently changing or duplicating the original, using the raw image format. Other special handling software includes software for capturing images such as 2D scanning software, 3D scanning software and screen-capturing, or software for specialized graphic format processing such as raster image processing and file format conversion. Some tools may reduce the file size of graphics for web performance optimization while maintaining the image quality as best as possible.

== Software lists ==
- List of raster graphics editors
- List of vector graphics editors
- Comparison of computer-aided design software
- List of digital art software
- List of information graphics software
- List of concept- and mind-mapping software (description and list)
- List of 2D graphics software
- 3D computer graphics software (description and list)
- Presentation software (description and list)
- Desktop publishing (description and list)
- List of media players (viewing access only)
- Comparison of media players

== See also ==
- Computer art
- Computer generated imagery
- Computer graphics
- Digital artist
- Graphics programs
- Raster graphics editor
- Vector graphics editor
