= Dabbler =

Drawing software by Corel

Art Dabbler (previously, Dabbler)
- Developers: Fractal Design Corporation, MetaCreations, Corel Corporation
- Stable release: Corel Art Dabbler 2
- Operating system: Mac OS, Microsoft Windows
- Type: Raster graphics editor
- License: Proprietary
- Website: Corel Homepage

Dabbler is natural media drawing software for beginners. It was initially developed by Fractal Design Corporation. It is a simplified version of Fractal Design Painter, and included multimedia tutorials and a fullscreen interface. Dabbler was released as "Art Dabbler" after the MetaCreations merger, and rights were eventually transferred to Corel. Dabbler operating systems are Mac OS and Microsoft Windows.

== See also ==
- Corel Painter
