= Corel Painter =

Raster-based digital painting software

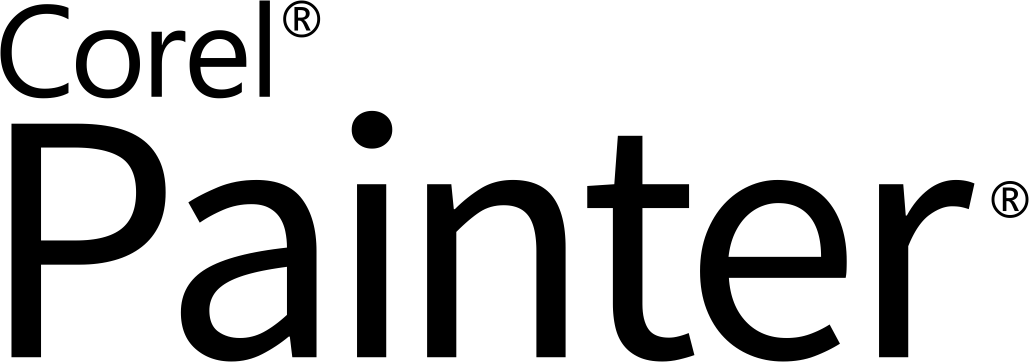

- Corel Painter IX
- Original authors: Mark Zimmer; Tom Hedges
- Developer: Corel
- Stable release: Corel Painter 2023 / June 21, 2022; 3 years ago
- Operating system: macOS, Microsoft Windows
- Type: Raster graphics editor
- License: Proprietary
- Website: www.painterartist.com

Corel Painter is a raster-based digital art application created to simulate as accurately as possible the appearance and behavior of traditional media associated with drawing, painting, and printmaking. It is intended to be used in real-time by professional digital artists as a functional creative tool.

== Materials and tools ==
The application offers a wide range of traditional artists' materials and tools. With the aid of a graphics tablet or computer mouse, the user is able to reproduce the effect of physical painting and drawing media such as watercolor, oil, chalk, charcoal and color pencil. There are also a few non-traditional items, such as the Image Hose, pattern pens, F/X, Distortion and Artist tools for allowing artists to apply less conventional elements on an image.

Painter emulates the visual characteristics of traditional media, such as oil paint, pastel sticks, air brush, charcoal, felt pens, and other traditional artists' materials on various textured surfaces. Many of these emulated media types work with the advanced features of Wacom tablets. For instance, the airbrush tool in Painter responds to pressure as well as tilt, velocity and rotation.

Painter and Photoshop have many similarities, such as layered editing. The two products have developed as contemporaries, introducing innovations that are now considered standard in bitmap image editing software. For example, "Floaters" were released with Painter 2.5, around the time that Photoshop released "composite elements". Over time, Painter's user interface(UI) has been transformed to match Photoshop's UI.

== History ==
Painter was initially published in 1991 for the Macintosh system by Mark Zimmer and Tom Hedges, founders of the Fractal Design Corporation. Zimmer and Hedges had previously developed ImageStudio and ColorStudio, both image-editing applications, for Letraset. John Derry joined Zimmer and Hedges during the release cycle of Painter 1.2. Derry had gained previous paint software expertise at Time Arts, a developer of the early desktop-based paint applications Lumena and Oasis. Fractal Design later merged with RayDream, then with MetaTools to become MetaCreations. Metacreations sold off all their creative interests and Painter was acquired by Corel Corporation where it was temporarily rebranded "Procreate" Painter during its transition into the Corel Suite of graphic applications. Painter is now wholly owned and marketed by Corel.

== Painter Series ==
At one point, Painter had three companion applications: a vector-based natural media twin called Expression; a scaled-down version of Painter developed for beginners called Dabbler (later renamed Art Dabbler after the MetaCreations merger); and a grayscale-only clone called Sketcher. After the Corel acquisition, Art Dabbler 2 was reintroduced as Corel Painter Essentials, now in its sixth incarnation.

In 2007, Corel released version Painter X, which was at first available in a limited edition paint can, a nod to the packaging for early releases of the software.

=== Painter Essentials ===
Corel Painter Essentials is a less complex version of Painter designed for casual users. Multimedia tutorials, a more intuitive workspace, additional automated tasks and emphasis on photo retouching are some of the features included to appeal to beginners. Painter and Painter Essentials share much of the same underlying code, and have many of the same tools and functions. For professional artists, Essentials will offer fewer tools and variants, and considerably less control. Actual in 2021 is Version 8.

=== Painter Sketch Pad ===
Corel Painter Sketch Pad, launched in January 2009, is the newest member of the Painter product series. Sketch Pad focuses on the conception and early design phase of image creation. It has 13 drawing tools compared to Painter's almost 900 brushes, and a simple user interface that supports quick capturing of creative ideas. It is designed to work with a pen and drawing tablet.

== Reception ==
In 2014, PC World called Painter "the best natural-media painting program out there." In 2015, PC Magazine called it "The best software for simulating painting and working with artistic media". In 2017, ZDNet said it "remains one of the best digital painting tools for anyone with the skill to use traditional painting techniques onscreen".

== Notable Artists ==
- Rhoda Grossman
- Cher Pendarvis
- Jeremy Sutton

== See also ==
- Comparison of raster graphics editors
- List of 2D graphics software
