= Raster graphics editor =

Type of application software

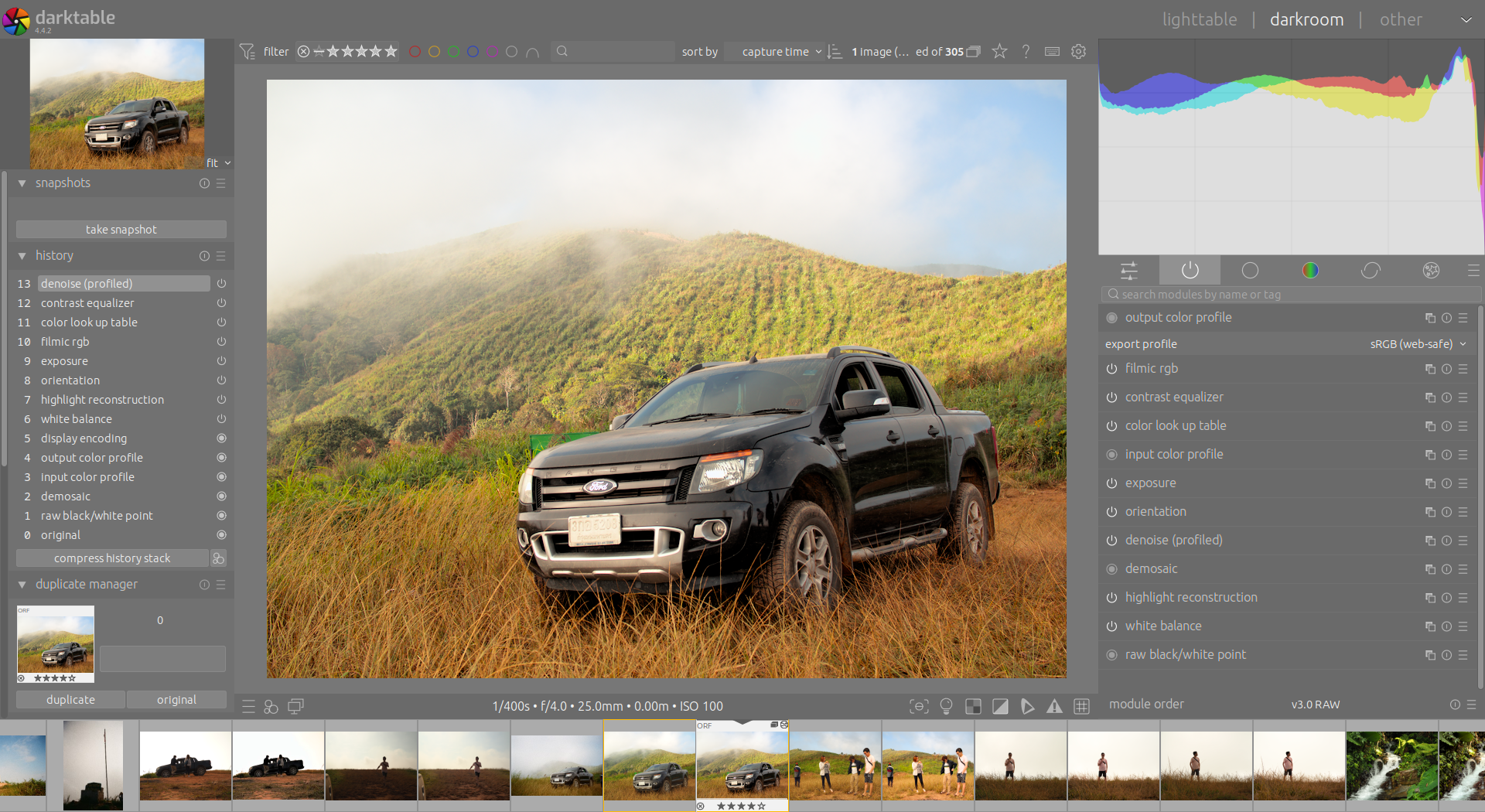
Darktable, a raw photo post-processing application

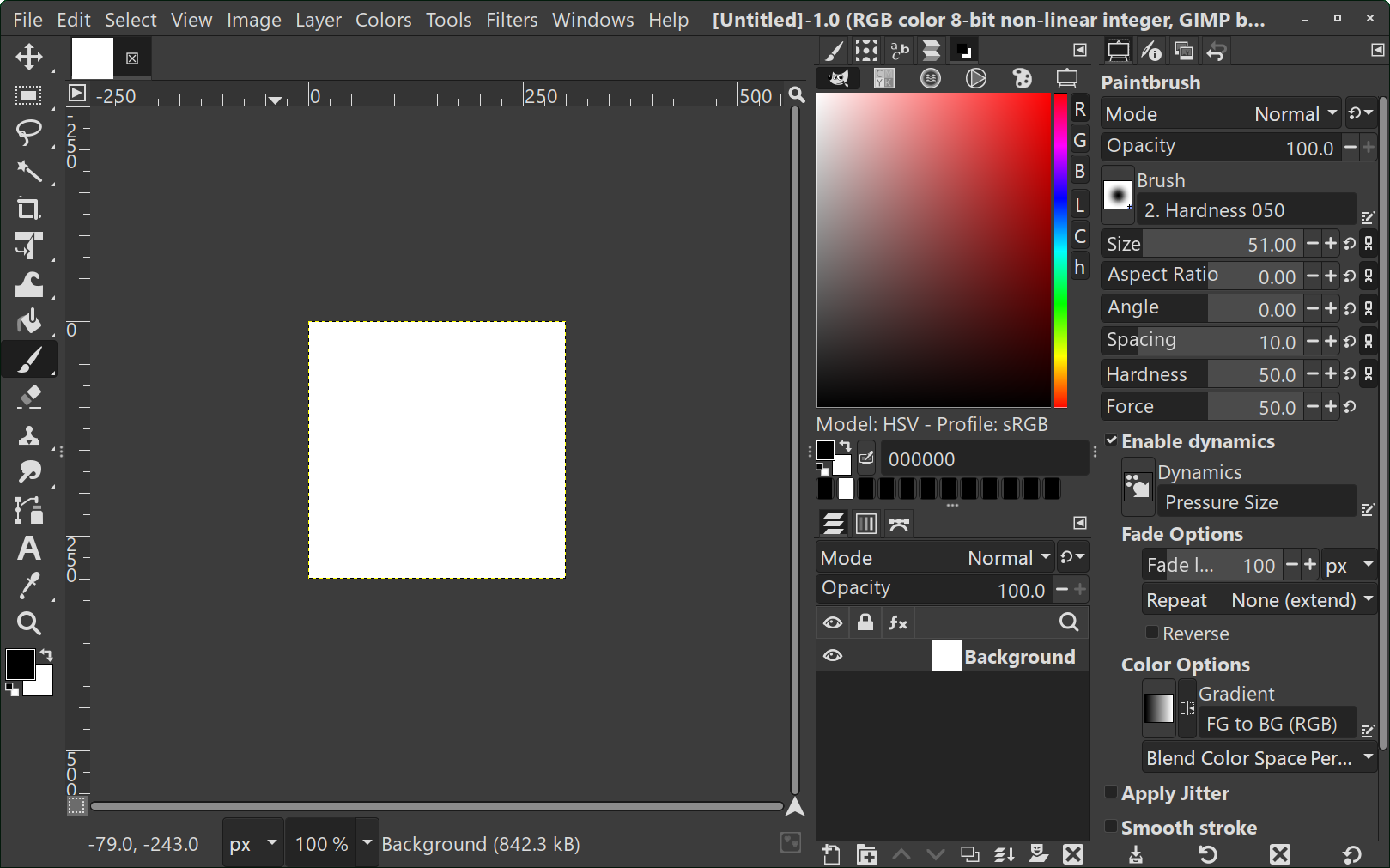
GIMP, a feature-rich general-purpose raster graphics editor

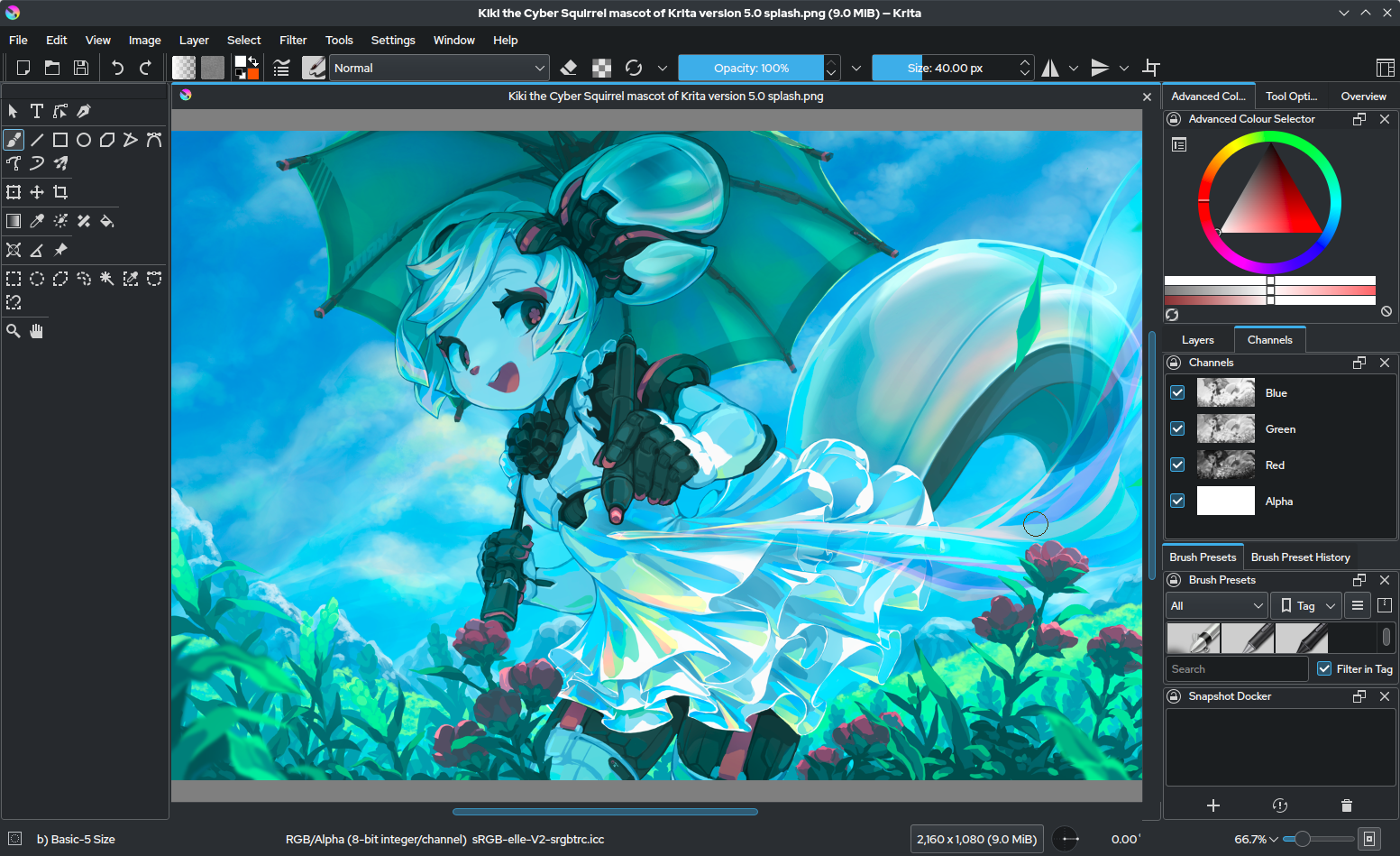
Krita, a raster graphics editor designed primarily for digital art and 2D animation

A raster graphics editor (also called bitmap graphics editor or sometimes an image manipulation program derived from GIMP) is a computer program that allows users to create and edit images interactively on the computer screen and save them in one of many raster graphics file formats (also known as bitmap images) such as JPEG, PNG, and GIF.

== Comparison to vector graphic editors ==
Vector graphics editors are often contrasted with raster graphics editors, yet their capabilities complement each other. The technical difference between vector and raster editors stem from the difference between vector and raster images. Vector graphics are created mathematically, using geometric formulas. Each element is created and manipulated numerically; essentially using Cartesian coordinates for the placement of key points, and then a mathematical algorithm to connect the dots and define the colors.

Raster images include digital photos. A raster image is made up of rows and columns of dots, called pixels, and is generally more photo-realistic. This is the standard form for digital cameras; whether it be a .raw file or .jpg file, the concept is the same. The image is represented pixel by pixel, like tiny squares in a grid.

Vector editors tend to be better suited for graphic design, page layout, typography, logos, sharp-edged artistic illustrations, e.g., cartoons, clip art, complex geometric patterns, technical illustrations, diagramming and flowcharting.

Advanced raster editors, like GIMP and Adobe Photoshop, use vector methods (mathematics) for general layout and elements such as text, but are equipped to deal with raster images down to the pixel and often have special capabilities in doing so, such as brightness/contrast, and even adding "lighting" to a raster image or photograph.

== Popular editors ==
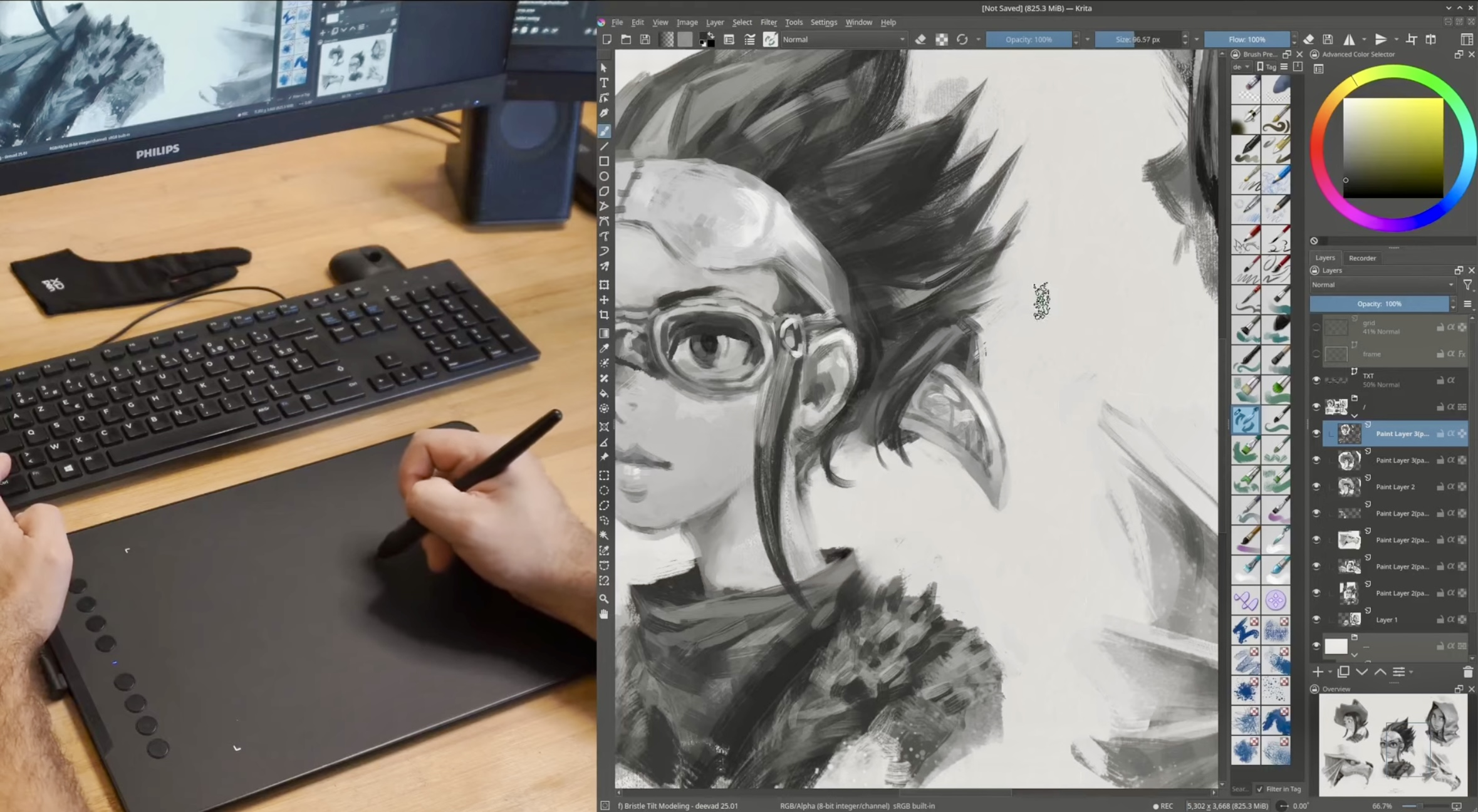
XP-PEN Deco 01V3 graphics tablet using Krita

- Adobe Photoshop: Industry standard for photography, design, and digital art
- GIMP: Free, open-source image manipulation program with similar features to Photoshop
- Corel Painter: Focuses on digital painting with traditional art simulation
- Affinity Photo: Professional-grade tools with a one-time purchase model
- Procreate: Popular app for digital painting on iPad
- Krita : Popular free and open-source program for a variety of operating systems

== Common features ==
- Select a region for editing
- Draw lines with simulated brushes of different color, size, shape and pressure
- Fill a region with a single color, gradient of colors, or a texture
- Select a color using different color models, e.g., RGB, HSV, or by using a color dropper
- Edit and convert between various color models
- Add typed letters in various font styles
- Remove imperfections from photo images
- Composite editing using layers
- Apply filters for effects including sharpening and blurring
- Convert between various image file formats

== See also ==
- Comparison of raster graphics editors
- List of digital art software
- Vector graphics editor
- Texture mapping
- Text editor
- 3D modeling
