= Experimentalism =

Experimentalism is the philosophical belief that the way to truth is through experiments and empiricism. It is also associated with instrumentalism, the belief that truth should be evaluated based upon its demonstrated usefulness. Experimentalism is considered a theory of knowledge that emphasizes direct action and scientific control as well as methods and consequences.

== Conceptualizations ==
Experimentalism is referred to as John Dewey's version of pragmatism. The theory, which he also called as practicalism, holds that the pattern for knowledge should be modern science and modern scientific methods. Dewey explained that philosophy involves the critical evaluation of belief and that the concept's function is practical. This perspective has influenced modern American intellectual culture leading to a correction of approaches to science that had excessive concentrations on theory.

While experimentalism is empirical in approach, experimentalism is distinguished from empiricism. The latter involves the passive view of sense data and observational reports while the former focuses on conditions where hypotheses are tested. Experimentalists maintain that political and moral concepts arise because of conflict, hence consider experience and history as essential. It is also maintained that the experimental attitude is based on the principle of fallibilism, operating with the notion that outcomes of prior inquiries are not absolutely certain or already known and that prior findings could be wrong.

Deborah Mayo suggests that we should focus on how experimental knowledge is actually arrived at and how it functions in science. Mayo also suggests that the reason New Experimentalists have come up short, is that the part of experiments that have the most to offer in building an account of inference and evidence that are left untapped: designing, generating, modelling and analysing experiments and data.

== Applications ==
Artists often pursue their visions through trial and error; this form of experimentalism has been practiced in every field, including music, film, literature, and theatre. A more specific explanation cites that this experimentalism is inductive in nature, with artists (e.g. Michelangelo and Titian) proceeding by trial and error as opposed to the conceptualists' approach, which favors making preparatory work while step changes are made in their progress.

Artistic experimentalism taken as a rule is generally associated with an attendant avant-garde.

In literature, the experimental approach may involve the production of texts through a combination of new procedures of literary production such as the inclusion of images in poetry. This is also seen in the works of computer artists or those who integrate technology in their art. For instance, Stan VanderBeek produced Poemfield through programming using BEFLIX to animate the poem's words and embed a geometric background.

In education, there is the position that learners continuously need new methods and experimentalism is essential in the development process. Through the method of learning-by-doing, it is expected that the learner develops his capacities and interests so that they empower him to assume the role of constructive participant in the life of the wider society. The experimentalist's view emphasizes the importance of life experience as the basis of what is learned. Experiences are said to consist the active interrelationship between the individual and the external world.

Global security specialists employ experimentalism to develop and maintain multi-faceted projects as well as determine innovative tools of governance. Such projects are operationalized through a trial-and-error and adaptive manner.

== See also ==
- Experimental political science
- Experimental philosophy
- Experimental physics
- Positivism
