= Poem Field =

Computer-generated animations by Stan Vanderbeek and Ken Knowlton

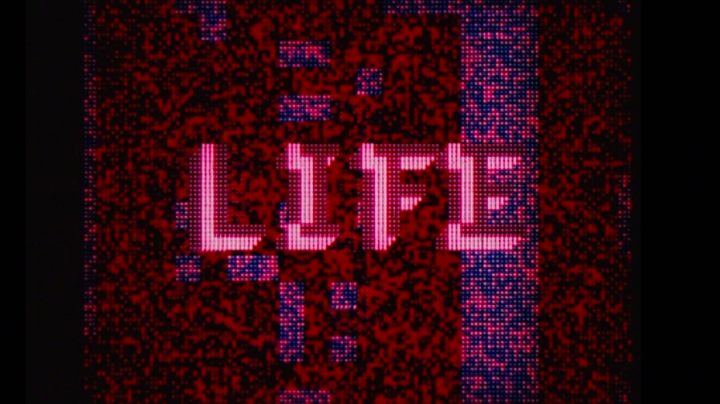
Extract from the digital artwork Poem Field No. 2 by artist Stan Vanderbeek.

Poem Field is a series of 8 computer-generated animations by Stan Vanderbeek and Ken Knowlton in 1964-1967. The animations were programmed in a language called Beflix (short for "Bell Flicks"), which was developed by Knowlton.

It is notable as a feature of one of the earlier SIGGRAPH conferences.
