= Cities of Peace =

Art exhibition

The Ellen Frank Illumination Arts Foundation's Cities of Peace exhibition highlights areas of the world that have been affected by conflict. The foundation's website explains that Ellen Frank's visit to Jerusalem in 1999 inspired the first painting in the series, and envisioned creating other works representing cities that have endured strife. the series aims to transform anguish into beauty by celebrating the resilience of the human spirit.

The project was produced under the artistic direction of Ellen Frank and involved interns from diverse backgrounds at the Illumination Atelier of Ellen Frank Illumination Arts Foundation. The exhibition debuted at the Laurie M. Tisch Gallery of the JCC Manhattan in 2005–2006, with a later exhibition held on January 7, 2009, at the Cathedral of St. John the Divine in New York City. The cities featured in the project include Baghdad, Kabul, Jerusalem, Beijing, Hiroshima, New York City, and Lhasa. with future works planned for cities such as Hanoi, Seoul, and Warsaw.

Each painting in the series incorporates a gold leaf, symbolizing the need for understanding in achieving peace. Additionally, a crimson leaf, symbolizing the bloodshed in these cities, is included to honor the dead. Frank incorporates each country's artistic traditions, including illuminated manuscripts, embroidery, mosaics, icons, tapestries, woodcarvings, and micrography into their respective works.

== Jerusalem ==
This work was inspired by the approach to Jerusalem, often referred to as the Golden City. The artist describes the scene of "the cab rounding a corner, the first glimpse of the old city wall, and the city itself hovering behind King David's Gate." The painting features notable landmarks such as the Golden Gate, the Western Wall, and the Dome of the Rock. The border combines an Islamic floral motif with the Star of David, symbolizing a unification of cultures and a desire for peace. The artwork features hundreds of small figures representing those impacted by conflict in the region and those who hope for peace there. [(Israel) 4 types of 22-karat gold leaf, mica, egg tempera on Belgian linen (69 x 104 in.) 2004]

== Sarajevo ==
This piece depicts the ethnic and religious diversity of Sarajevo, using imagery inspired by illuminated manuscripts. The red-tiled roofs of the city's mosques, minarets, and spires are represented, along with the languages and symbols unique to Sarajevo. The city's churches, mosques, and synagogues which often stood side-by-side, highlight Sarajevo's tradition of benefaction. The painting responds to cultural destruction that took place during the longest military siege in modern history, honoring Sarajevo's spirit, and artistic heritage [(Bosnia-Herzegovina) 22 k gold leaf, palladium, moon, and copper leaf, with egg tempera on Belgian linen. (69 X 104 in.) 2007]

== Monrovia ==
Frank describes this work as celebrating the creation of Liberia and its cultural diversity. The painting aligns different ethnicities and cultural practices as star patterns against the backdrop of night, symbolizing unity and the achievements that characterize Monrovia. (Liberia) Palladium and moon gold, watercolor on Belgian linen (69 X 104 in.) 2007]

== Hiroshima ==
This piece represents the five emperors of Hiroshima, each symbolized by a portrait or a flag. Large-scale figures appear throughout the painting, tucked behind the leaves and in motion. The artwork also features plum blossom cascading across a 1945 U.S. military aerial reconnaissance photograph of Hiroshima. [(Japan) 22-karat moon gold, 12-karat white gold, egg tempera on Belgian linen (69 x 104 in.) 2005 Leaf, gift of Richard Swaim.

== Lhasa ==
Inspired by the columns of the Jokhang monastery, this painting incorporates motifs from Tibetan mudras along its borders. Micrography featuring verses by an anonymous sixth-century poet's words cascades across the city's skyline. [(Tibet) 22-karat gold leaf, egg tempera on Belgian linen (69 x 104 in.) 2005]

=== Baghdad ===
This work is inspired by Baghdad's rich history, The painting layers maps that trace over five thousand years of the city's history, reflecting its period of grandeur and devastation. Two large figures bowing to honor the people of Iraq, and the border design draws from Al-Kadhimain Mosque. The painting centers around Baghdad, surrounded by mirrored muqarnas inspired by Zumurrud Khatan's tomb. [(Iraq) 22-karat gold leaf, 23-karat red gold, palladium leaf, mica, egg tempera on Belgian linen (69 x 104 in.) 2005 Leaf, gift of an anonymous donor]

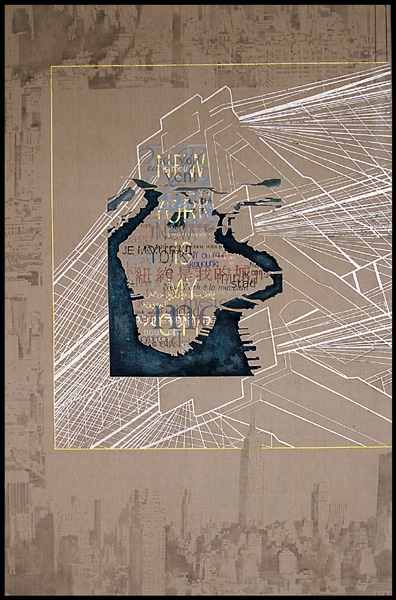
New York: This is My City!

=== New York ===
This painting offers a view of Midtown Manhattan, looking east. Frank describes the work as featuring over forty-five buildings from 34th to 59th streets, each over 600-feet tall. [(USA) 22-karat gold leaf, palladium leaf, egg tempera on Belgian linen (104 x 69 in.) 2005]

=== Kabul ===
Kabul: I Love Her

This piece, inspired by a panoramic photo of Kabul from 1870 to 1882, features gold-leaf micrography. Traditional Afghan symbols such as dance and books, which were once banned, are woven into the design, along with mountains and figures standing above the city, to symbolize a prayer for the healing of Kabul's people. [(Afghanistan) 22-karat gold leaf, moon gold, egg tempera on Belgian linen (104 x 69 in.) 2005]

=== Beijing ===
This painting celebrates Beijing as a sacred city. It incorporates elements from the city plan, the Purple Protected Enclosure star pattern, and geographic symbols such as Luoshu and Hetu diagrams. Large figures reference Beijing's historical dance, costume, and architecture, highlighting both the city's ancient and modern aspects. [(China) 22-karat gold leaf, 23-karat red gold, 12-karat white gold, 22-karat moon gold, mica and bronze powders, egg tempera on Belgian linen (104 x 69 in.) 2005]
