= Ken Knowlton =

American computer graphics pioneer (1931–2022)

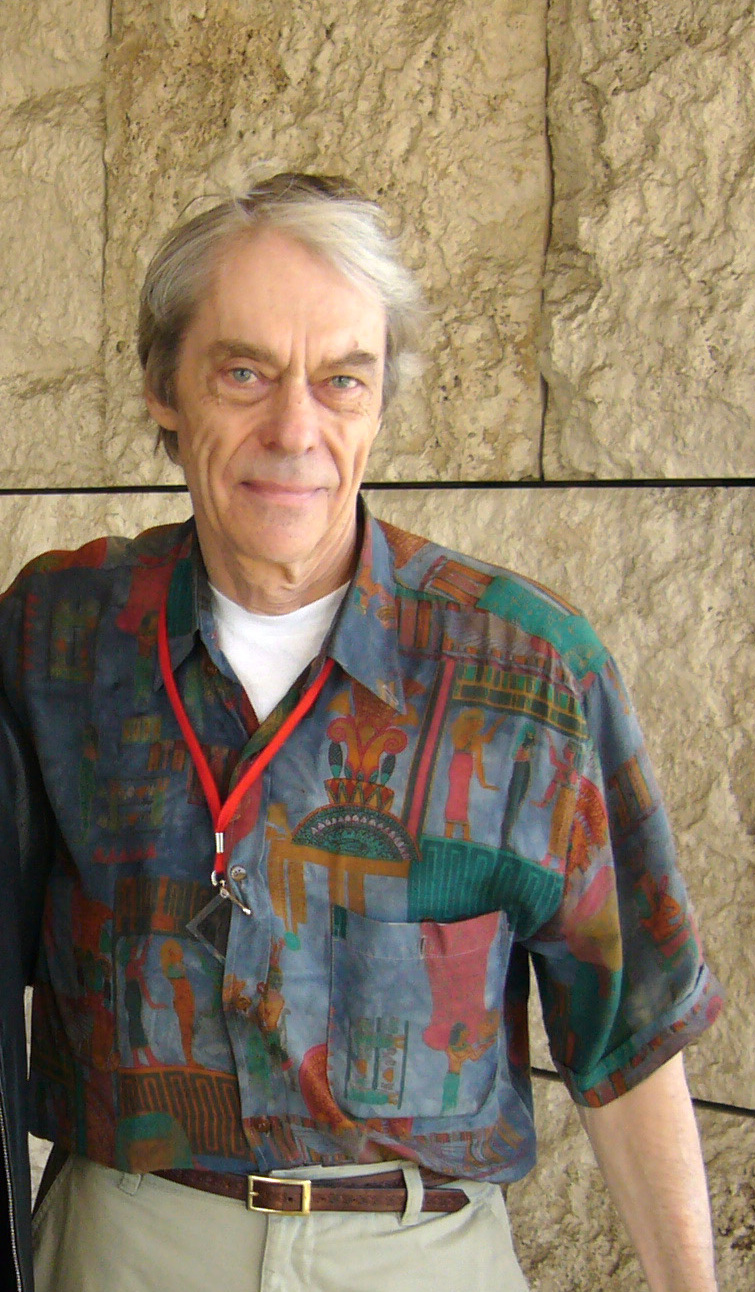
- Knowlton in 2007
- Born: Kenneth Charles Knowlton; June 6, 1931; Springville, New York, U.S.
- Died: June 16, 2022 (aged 91); Sarasota, Florida, U.S.
- Spouses: Roberta Behrens; Barbara Bean
- Children: 5

Academic background
- Education: Cornell University (BS, MS); Massachusetts Institute of Technology (PhD)
- Doctoral advisor: Victor Yngve

Academic work
- Discipline: Engineering; Art
- Sub-discipline: Computer engineering Computer graphics

Kenneth Charles Knowlton (June 6, 1931 – June 16, 2022) was an American computer graphics pioneer, artist, mosaicist and portraitist. In 1963, while working at Bell Labs, he developed the BEFLIX programming language for creating bitmap computer-produced movies. In 1966, also at Bell Labs, he and Leon Harmon created the computer artwork Computer Nude (Studies in Perception I).

== Early life and education ==
Kenneth Charles Knowlton was born to Frank and Eva (Reith) Knowlton in Springville, New York, on June 6, 1931. He completed high school one year early, then entered Cornell University to study engineering physics. After finishing his undergraduate degree, he continued to a master's degree. He completed his M.S. in 1955; the title of his thesis was "X-Ray Microscopy with a Modified RCA Electron Microscope."

In 1962, Knowlton earned his Ph.D. degree from the Department of Electrical Engineering at the Massachusetts Institute of Technology in 1962 under the supervision of Victor Yngve. His thesis was titled "Sentence Parsing with a Self-Organizing Heuristic Program".

== Career ==
In 1963, Knowlton developed the BEFLIX (Bell Flicks) programming language for bitmap computer-produced movies, created using an IBM 7094 computer and a Stromberg-Carlson 4020 microfilm recorder. Each frame contained eight shades of grey and a resolution of 252 x 184. Knowlton worked with artists, including Stan VanDerBeek and Lillian Schwartz. He and VanDerBeek created the Poem Field animations. Knowlton also created another programming language named EXPLOR (EXplicit Patterns, Local Operations and Randomness).

In 1966, he prepared an animated film as an introduction to the Bell Telephone Laboratories' Low-Level Linked List Language (L^{6}).

In 1966, Knowlton and Leon Harmon were experimenting with photomosaics, creating large prints from collections of small symbols or images. In Computer Nude (Studies in Perception I) they created an image of a reclining nude (choreographer Deborah Hay), by scanning a photograph with a camera and converting the analog voltages to binary numbers, which were assigned typographic symbols based on halftone densities. It was printed in The New York Times on October 11, 1967, as the first full frontal nude published in the paper, and exhibited at one of the earliest computer art exhibitions, The Machine as Seen at the End of the Mechanical Age, held at the Museum of Modern Art in New York City from November 25, 1968, through February 9, 1969. The artwork in Studies in Perception also launched Robert Rauschenberg's Experiments in Art and Technology (E.A.T.). In 1969, Knowlton and Harmon continued the series with Gulls (Studies in Perception II) and Gargoyle (Studies in Perception III).

Knowlton's work had been previously exhibited at Cybernetic Serendipity, an exhibition held at the Institute of Contemporary Arts in London from August 2 to October 20, 1968.

Knowlton co-invented Ji Ga Zo with Mark Setteducati, released in the United States on March 30, 2011. Ji Ga Zo is a puzzle in which the user assembles a mosaic from 300 shaded pieces to form a digitized image from the user's own photograph.

Technology historian Jim Boulton worked with Knowlton to reconstruct the algorithm used to generate Studies in Perception I, which was used to make a remastered version of the original work in 2016. As a fundraiser for Rhizome, Knowlton and Boulton used the algorithm in 2022 to generate a portrait of E.A.T. director Julie Martin, Studies in Perception IV: Julie Martin.

== Personal life and death ==
Knowlton had three sons and two daughters from his first marriage to Roberta Behrens, which ended in divorce. His second wife, Barbara Bean, died before him. He died at a hospice facility in Sarasota, Florida, on June 16, 2022, ten days after his 91st birthday.
