= Charles Fazzino =

American painter

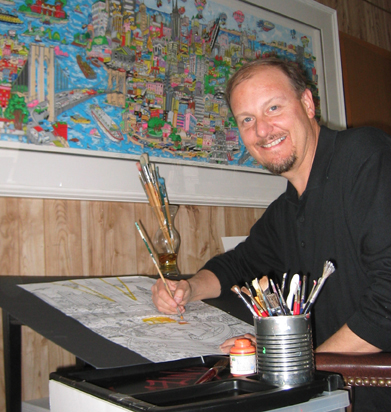
- Charles Fazzino in his studio
- Born: 26 December 1955; New York City
- Education: New York School of Visual Arts
- Known for: Painting, Silkscreen and Sculpture
- Movement: Pop Art

Charles Fazzino is an American pop artist, known for his silkscreen serigraphs in a 3D pop art style. His artwork is influenced from urban landscapes, sporting events, and celebrities.

Charles Fazzino in his Studio in New Rochelle

== Background ==
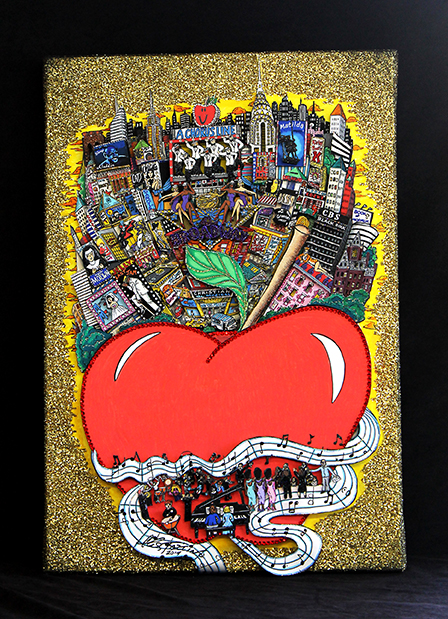
Front view of "Raining Going d" by Charles Fazzino

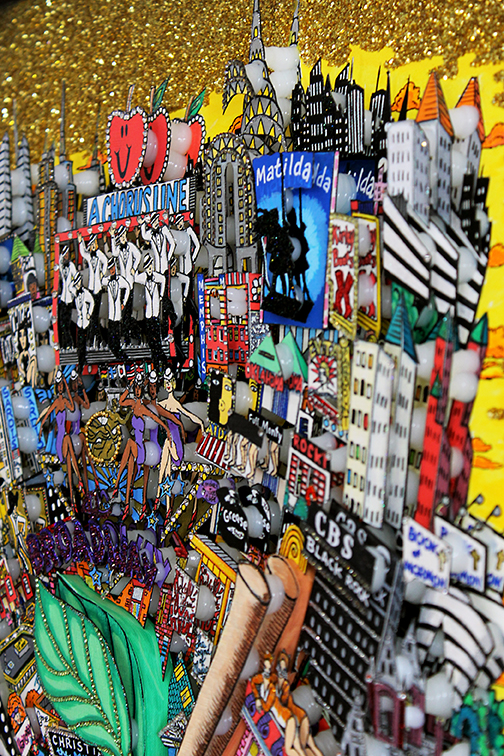
Side view of "Raining Gold", showing the 3D design of the artwork

Born in 1955, Charles Fazzino is the son of a Finnish sculptor (Irene) and an Italian mode shoe designer (Salvatore). He took his first formal art class as a 7th grader in 1967 and later graduated from the School of Visual Arts in Manhattan in 1977 with a degree in Bachelor of Arts.

Fazzino's artwork is displayed in 20 countries. A majority of his event-specific artwork for major events represents The Super Bowl, The Grammy Awards, The Pori Jazz Festival, Major League Baseball All-Star Game, and the Daytime Emmy Awards.

Fazzino is known for the three-dimensionality of his silkscreen serigraphs. He showed his first three-dimensional print at the Greenwich Village Art Show in New York City that May. He began using the silkscreen printing process in 1985 and eventually included giclée printing in his art production process in the 2000s. The artist begins with a rough sketch which then becomes a hand-painted original artwork using pencil, paint markers, and acrylic paint. The artwork is then either hand-screen printed using a silkscreen printing process, or digitally giclée printed. Once copies of the prints are made, pieces of the prints are hand-cut and hand-glued to create Fazzino's signature 3D look. Fazzino often equates the process of building up the layers of artwork to "layering it like a lasagna." The 3D artworks are glittered and given Swarovski crystals.

== Special event commissions ==
NFL Super Bowl

Charles Fazzino's art has been featured in every Super Bowl for the National Football League since the 2001 Super Bowl XXXV in Tampa Bay, Florida.

Fazzino was profiled by CBS News Sunday Morning with Charles Osgood on Charles Osgood Sunday in New Orleans, Louisiana on February 3, 2013. He also created a painting for Super Bowl XLVIII in 2014, where the Seattle Seahawks defeated the Denver Broncos at MetLife Stadium, as well as The New England Patriots 2015 win in Super Bowl XLIX in Phoenix, Arizona. Fazzino's licensed commemorative painting for Super Bowl LI in Houston, Texas, valued at $15,000 UDS, was unveiled at a private reception. The painting was later auctioned off and proceeds were donated to the WithMerci Foundation.

During the week leading up to Super Bowl LIII in Atlanta, Charles Fazzino appeared in a segment for Inside Edition.com, during which he was interviewed by the program's guest Super Bowl correspondent Kelleth Cuthbert, aka the Fiji Water Girl.

Fazzino commemorated his twentieth Super Bowl for the National Football League during Super Bowl LIV in Miami. The artist appeared at The Seminole Hard Rock Hotel & Casino and at the Super Bowl Experience in the Miami Beach Convention Center alongside former NY Giant Mathias Kiwanuka and Miami Dolphin Davon Godchaux.

League Baseball

Fazzino has created artwork for more thirteen Major League Baseball All-Star Games. In 2014, when the All-Star Game was in Minneapolis, he partnered with The Minnesota Twins Community Foundation to raise funds.

- 2016 All-Star Game in San Diego
- 2018 All-Star Game in Washington DC
- 2019 All-Star Game in Cleveland
- 2021 All-Star Game in Denver
- 2022 All-Star Game in Los Angeles
- 2023 All-Star Game in Seattle
- 2024 All-Star Game in Arlington

Fazzino was also commissioned to create the official artwork for the 75th Anniversary of Little League Baseball. As part of the project, he spent several days in Williamsport in February 2014, conducting educational workshops for students and teachers. The resulting work was exhibited during the World Series at the Gallery at Penn College. Fazzino's official art was also unveiled during the series and installed in the World of Little League Museum.

Daytime Emmy Awards

- 2007 Daytime Emmy Awards
- 2008 Daytime Emmy Awards
- 2011 Daytime Emmy Awards

Grammy Awards

- 2004 Grammy Awards – Fazzino created the official artwork for the 46th annual Grammy Awards. He joined the ranks of artists such as world-renowned architect Frank Gehry, Photographer/Filmmaker David LaChapelle, and Mosaic Artist Roy Feinson, who have all been commissioned by the Academy.

United States Olympic Committee

- 2016 – Rio Summer Olympics
- 2013 – Warrior Games – Fazzino commissioned by the United States Olympic Committee to create the official artwork for the 2013 Warrior Games.

Theater

In 2012, he collaborated with the producers of The Ride. The Fazzino Ride was an interactive tour of Manhattan designed by Fazzino and Ride producer Richard Humphrey. The Fazzino Ride was nominated for a 2013 Drama Desk Award for Unique Theatrical Experience.

Winterfest Boat Parade

Charles Fazzino was commissioned to create the official artwork for the 50th anniversary of the Fort Lauderdale Winterfest Boat Parade.

Toys for Tots

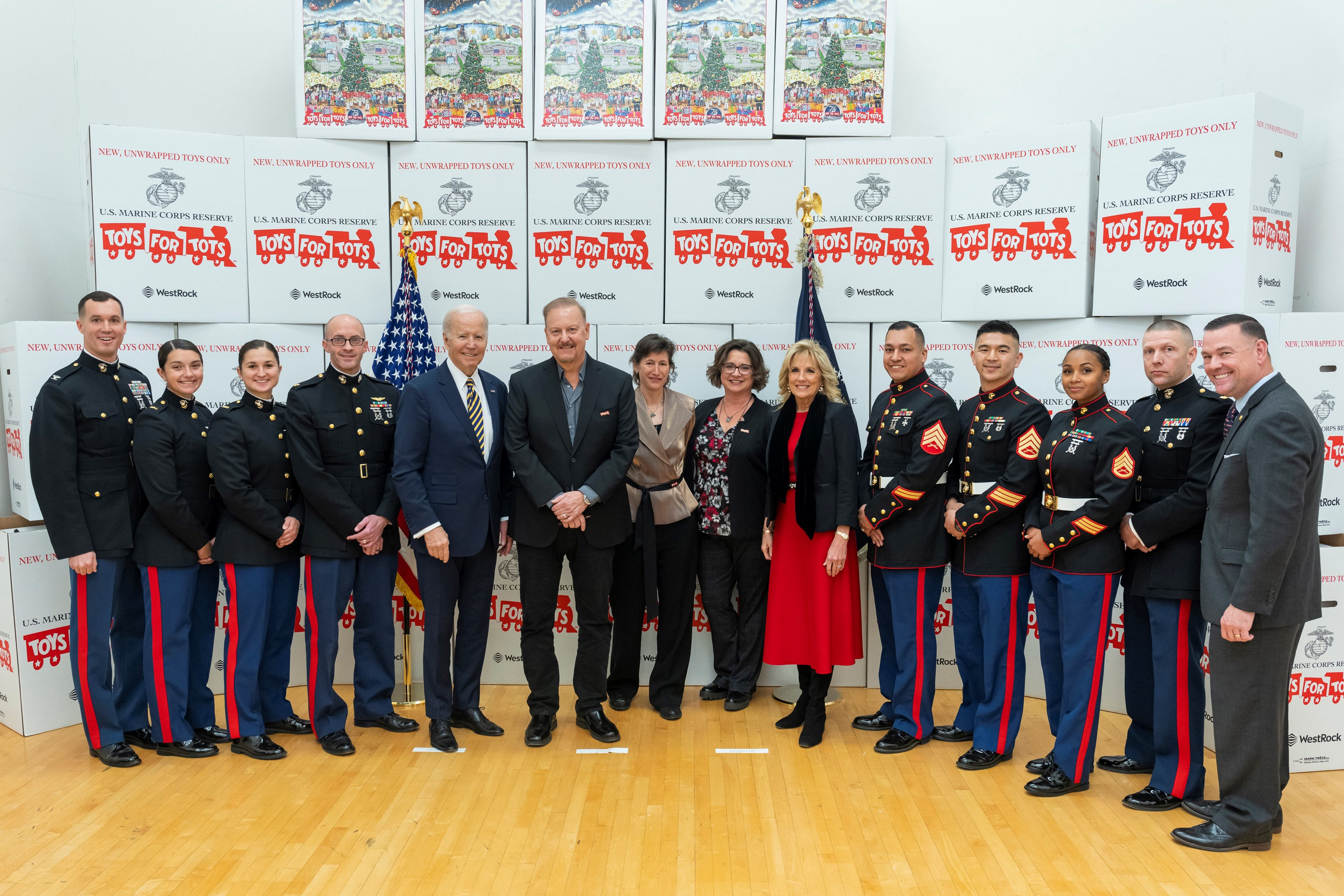
Charles Fazzino with POTUS Joe Biden, First Lady Jill Biden, and Marines at the Annual Toys for Tots Sorting Ceremony in Washington, DC.

In 2022, Fazzino commissioned by the United States Marine Corps Reserve's Toys for Tots program to create their 75th Anniversary Commemorative art. Secretary of the Navy Carlos Del Toro unveiled Charles Fazzino's official artwork for the 75th anniversary of the US Corps. Reserve Toys for Tots in 2022. The artwork was mounted on Toys for Tots donation boxes during the 2022 holiday season.

On December 12, 2022, Charles Fazzino participated in the First Lady Jill Biden’s Toys for Tots Annual Sorting Event with POTUS Joe Biden. On December 13, Fazzino attended a Soft Ribbon Cutting Ceremony for the Toys for Tots Wall at The Pentagon, where his Official Toys for Tot’s 75th Anniversary artwork was permanently mounted. Secretary of the Navy Carlos Del Toro and Lieutenant General David G. Bellon awarded Fazzino the Department of the Navy’s Superior Public Service Medal at the end of the ceremony.

== Major works and public installations ==
JFK International Airport Collection for American Airlines at Terminal 8: The collection includes a 6' by 7' rotating 3D sculpture of an American Airlines plane entitled From New York...to the World and a 13' three-dimensional mural.

- 2016 Westchester Medical Center commissioned Charles Fazzino to decorate the outside of their Mobile Health Coach.
- 2018 Stamford, CT commissioned Fazzino to paint outdoor kiosks.
- 2018 The city of New Rochelle, New York commissioned Charles Fazzino and his artist daughter Heather Fazzino to create and unveil the first of a series of public sculptures installed around the city to promote the "Ideally Yours" campaign.
- 2018 Hassenfeld Children's Hospital at NYU Langone Health commissioned Charles Fazzino to create a mural of New York City that is displayed in the hospital's lobby.
- 2018 NBC Sports commissioned Charles Fazzino to create an artwork celebrating their achievement of NBC Sunday Night Football becoming the number one show in prime time for seven consecutive years. Charles Fazzino, along with NBC Sports Chairman Mark Lazarus and Sunday Night Football director Fred Gaudelli unveiled the work at the network's NBC Headquarters in Stamford, Connecticut.
- 2019 Fazzino was commissioned to create two 16-foot tall steel sculptures, two indoor murals, and a seating area for Fiesta, in Busan, Korea.
- 2022 Fazzino commissioned by the United States Marin Corps Reserve's Toys for Tots program to create their 75th Anniversary Commemorative art. The artwork was mounted on Toys for Tots donation boxes during the 2022 holiday season and permanently installed in The Pentagon
- 2025

== Museum installations and exhibitions ==
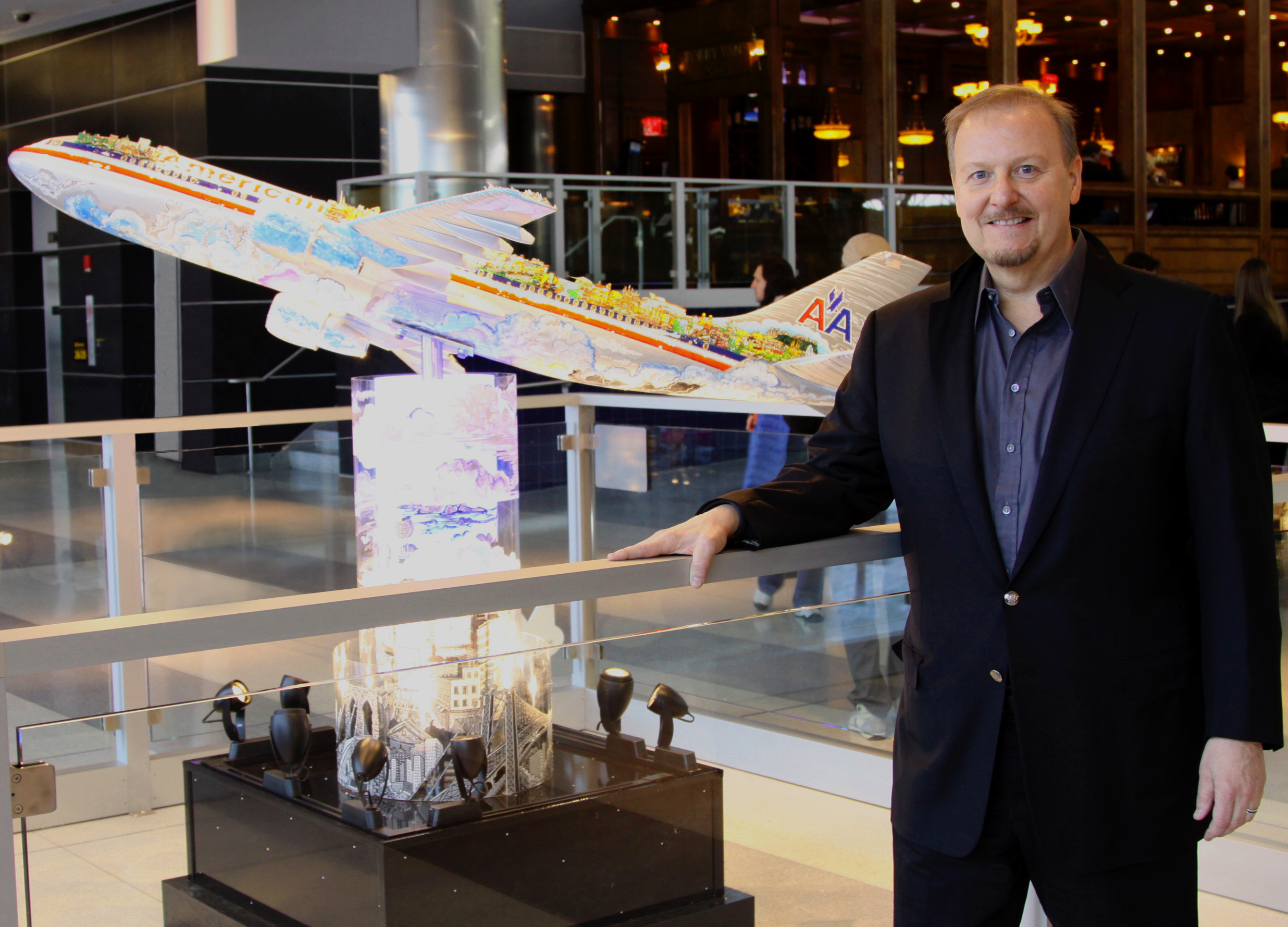
Charles Fazzino with 3-D popart plane sculpture at JFK airport

In 2010–2011, Fazzino hosted a major museum exhibition titled "The Faces of Fort Lauderdale" at the Museum of Art | Fort Lauderdale. The exhibition celebrated the 100-year history of the area.

Fazzino's first major museum exhibition in Germany took place from April 27 through June 22 at the International Academy of Art in Hembach. The district of Kreis Duren invited the artist to exhibit at the Academy and commissioned him to create an edition of artwork titled "For the Love of Kreis Düren".

In 2015, Fazzino was chosen to participate in a group show at the Coral Springs Museum of Art in Florida. The show, titled "The Art of Pop & Comics" featured eight pieces by Fazzino, including a tribute to the Masters titled "A Cartoon Celebration of the Masters," in which Fazzino weaves cartoon characters into pieced-together scenes. "This is a tribute piece," said Fazzino. "The paintings I chose from the Masters are so incredibly recognizable, as are the characters now interwoven throughout them. It's a meeting of two worlds with two different languages that come together in this one, intricately assembled, composition."

In 2015, Fazzino was commissioned to create an artwork celebrating the 50th Anniversary of Singapore. He made his debut in the country in May 2015 to participate in several receptions and a media tour.

In 2017, Holocaust Memorial and Tolerance Center of Nassau County opened a Fazzino exhibit in their museum titled "The Heroes of the Holocaust," featuring several new original works, and a series of plexiglass sculptures paying tribute to those who saved the lives of Jews during and after World War II. The limited edition artwork created specifically for the exhibit, "After the Darkness" was unveiled by Dani Dayan, Counsel General of Israel in New York.

In 2021, Charles Fazzino was commissioned by the National September 11 Museum & Memorial to create an image in tribute to the 20th anniversary of the World Trade Center terrorist attacks. The artwork was unveiled in a ceremony at the Museum with Anthoula Katsimatides, 9/11 family member; Joseph Esposito, former Chief of Department, NYPD; Salvatore Cassano, former Commissioner, FDNY; Salvatore Carcaterra, former Deputy Chief, NYPD; and San Panchal, former 1st grade detective, NYPD, Bernie Williams, retired NY Yankee, Pete Alonso, NY Met.

In 2024, the Osthuas Museum Hagen selected Charles Fazzino's artwork to be featured in a tribute exhibition for pop artist Joe Tilson. For the month of February, a selection of Fazzino's artwork was exhibited alongside the work of the late British artist and other renown pop artists.

In 2024, Fazzino commissioned by the White House Historical Association to create a commemorative artwork for an interactive educational experience in Washington D.C. called, "The People's House: A White House Experience". The commemorative artwork is entitled "The People's House: A Quilt of White House History”, and illustrates the history of the White House and the families who resided in it throughout United States history. The artwork is on display at The People’s House: A White House Experience.

== Exhibits ==
Fazzino's work is exhibited in:

- Denmark
- Dubai
- Finland

2009 – Official Artist Pori Jazz Festival in Pori, Finland

- France

2013 – The official artist for the annual Foie de Lyon festival in Lyon, France

- Germany
- India

2015 Joint Exhibition with Dudu Gerstein (David) at Habitat Centre in New Delhi

- Japan
- Luxembourg
- Singapore
- Spain
- Switzerland
- South Korea

Korean International Art Fair, 2016–2019

- United States

3D Studio Gallery, Santa Barbara, CA Ocean Galleries, Stone Harbor, NJ, Wentworth Galleries in Atlanta, GA; Boca Raton, FL; Hollywood, FL; Fort Lauderdale, FL Short Hills, NJ; Alexandria, VA; Bethesda, MD; King of Prussia, PA Art One Gallery, Hollywood, CA Barker Animation, Cheshire, CT, Central Galleries, Cedarhurst NY

2025 – Solo Exhibition at JR Kyoto Isetan in Kyoto, Japan

== Books ==
- June Vollman, Andrea Ruoff-Appel, Shari Ruoff & Charles Fazzino: Regards From Broadway Andrea Ruoff Art Associates, 1991, ISBN 978-0-9629193-0-5
- Heike Theuerkauf, Charles Fazzino, Marshall Lee, Phillip Davies: Charles Fazzino. Balance House, 1996, ISBN 0-940577-04-6
- Julie Maner, Charles Fazzino: Charles Fazzino, the master of 3-D pop art. Te Neues Verlag, 1999, ISBN 3-8238-5441-0
- Julie Maner, Charles Fazzino: Traffic 9 to 5, 24/7 Museum Editions, Ltd, 2004, ISBN 978-0-9755008-0-4
- Frank Radice, Vida Radice, Charles Fazzino: Sam Katz on the Loose! Random House Children's Books, 2005, ISBN 0-375-83120-7
- Julie Maner, Charles Fazzino: Fazzino's Passport to Our World Museum Editions, Ltd, 2007
- Charles Fazzino, Julie Maner: Now Playing on Broadway. Museums Edition Ltd., 2010, ISBN 0-9755008-4-8
- Julie Maner, Charles Fazzino: O' Beautiful For Spacious Skies. Museums Edition Ltd., 2014, ISBN 0-9755008-5-6
- Julie Maner, Charles Fazzino: The Sun Shines Bright Over the Big Apple. Museum Editions, Ltd., 2020 ISBN 978-0-9755008-1-1
