= Feinson =

Feinson is a surname. Notable people with the surname include:

- Roy Feinson (born 1957), South African software engineer, author, and artist
