= Ellen Frank Illumination Arts Foundation =

Ellen Frank Illumination Arts Foundation is a non-profit organization with the stated goal of enabling the revitalization of the art of illumination.

== Overview ==
The organization aims to enhance understanding of the art and history of illumination among artists and the public, as well as enabling the creation of new work in this historic genre. This involves utilizing a renaissance style Atelier to produce its labor-intensive art works. Under the tutelage of artist Ellen Frank, the Atelier brings together students, artists, scholars, curators, and librarians from all over the world to work on its multi-cultural projects.

== History ==
=== Inspiration ===
Ellen Frank, an accomplished professor of literature and visual art, was inspired to transform her career from one concerned largely with theory to one engaged fully in praxis after seeing an exhibit by Joseph Beuys which left a marked impression. This transformation saw Frank rediscover the almost entirely unpracticed art of illumination. The ancient art of illumination, which explicitly explores the nexus between the written word and the artistically rendered image, made an ideal artistic home for Frank given her passion for both the visual arts and the written word.

=== Beginnings ===
Ellen Frank created her first large illumination project with the help of a paid assistant in 2000. This was a piece for original illuminated Hanukkah Illuminated: A Book of Days, which Frank created in collaboration with acclaimed scholar Everett Fox. Studied in Renaissance art, the thought of creating a modern-day collaborative in the style of a Renaissance Atelier came naturally. A prototype of the current Atelier received a founding grant from the New York State Council on the Arts in 2000, prior to the legal formation of EFIAF.

The Atelier held outreach demonstrations within the Long Island East End communities of New York and trained interns ranging in age from 18 to 65 years over a three-month period. The interns helped to produce two carpet pages—decorated illuminated pages without text, using elaborate designs evoking Eastern carpets—for the manuscript Hanukkah Illuminated: A Book of Days. The success of the collaborative work and the interns’ enthusiasm encouraged the formation of EFIAF to provide support for a more permanent and substantial illumination arts program.

The current Atelier has been functioning under EFIAF since May, 2005 as a 501 (C) (3) non-profit public benefit organization. The same year, the first group of summer interns from Carnegie Mellon University arrived. Since then, more than 17 resident interns, and a number of “day” interns from the community have assisted in the creation of six large, illuminated paintings in the series Cities of Peace for a debut exhibition at the Laurie M. Tisch Gallery of JCC Manhattan. Work on the research, design and execution of each provided a complex introduction to the techniques of illuminated painting as well as a distinctive historic and artistic learning experience.

== Present ==
From the Cities of Peace-Kabul: I Love Her

In the 2000s, the foundation completed a project called Cities of Peace that appeared in New York City at the Cathedral of St. John the Divine. The foundation is also currently working with the National Association of Women and Arts, and the United Nations. The Atelier continues its work with guest and intern artists from around the world. The foundation holds exhibitions and presents workshops, lectures, symposia and seminars on the art of illumination, the Atelier project and on art as a tool for global understanding.
