= Los Angeles Pop Art =

American artwork company

- Industry: Micrography artwork
- Founded: 2004
- Founder: Joseph Leibovic
- Headquarters: Las Vegas, Nevada, United States of America
- Website: www.lapopart.com

Los Angeles Pop Art (also known as LA Pop Art) is an American company, founded by Joseph Leibovic, headquartered in Las Vegas, Nevada. The company creates text based artwork, entirely drawn by hand, also known as Micrography. By using entire movie scripts, complete song lyrics and manuscripts, Los Angeles Pop Art creates images out of the text that tell the story of that specific image.

The portfolio of designs are used for the manufacture of a number of products, which include Apparel, Wall Art and more. These products are sold online in numerous stores as well as in traditional brick and mortar retailers. The portfolio is also licensed out to partner companies for the manufacture of a wide range of products that include everything from stickers to beach towels.

In 1994 founder Joseph Leibovic was living in Israel when he stumbled upon the Micrography style of art while watching street artists, in the mystical town of Tzvat. The idea of Americanizing this style of art, by creating posters of classic films out of entire scripts, and music icons out of their legendary lyrics, was matured over the following 9 years. It wasn't until Joseph moved back to Los Angeles, in 2004, that the idea was finally brought to life and Los Angeles Pop Art was founded.

Los Angeles Pop Art has worked with some of the biggest names in music and film creating pieces for ACDC, KISS, David Bowie, Def Leppard, ZZ Top, The Bob Marley Estate, Godfather, Scarface, Rocky, Nirvana, and many more A+ properties.

The work developed at Los Angeles Pop Art has been featured in top magazines such as Playboy, Rolling Stone, Maxim and Stuff, as well as in top rated TV and films like Breaking Bad, Weeds, The Sopranos, Jersey Shore, The Girls Next Door, Workaholics and Battle: Los Angeles.

Some of Los Angeles Pop Art's original art is also included in major art collections and exhibits, such as The Ronald Reagan Presidential Art Collection and being included in The Amazing Collection at Ripley's Believe it Or Not museums around the world.

== Notable accomplishments ==
Los Angeles Pop Art artwork representing Ronald Reagan using the "Tear down this wall!" speech.

Los Angeles Pop Art artwork in a poster depicting a film scene from Scarface, using the film script.

Illustration based on the Lewis Carroll's novel, Alice's Adventures in Wonderland made by Los Angeles Pop Art and published in the Ripley's Believe It or Not Annual 2012.

A Ronald Reagan design, recreating President Ronald Reagan’s face out of his famous "Tear down this wall!" speech, given at the Brandenburg Gate in Germany, was created by Los Angeles Pop Art in 2005. This piece of art was accepted by the Ronald Reagan Presidential Library into the Official Presidential Art Collection. The artwork is currently on display in the Lobby of the Ronald Reagan Presidential Library in Simi Valley, California.

A partnership with Vivendi Games, in 2006, regarding the release of Scarface: The World Is Yours video game, led Los Angeles Pop Art to create an exclusive poster to be used as a pre-order gift by Vivendi Games, in order to assist in the pre-ordering of the game. The poster consisted in depicting an iconic film scene, using micrography, with the original film script.

Joseph Leibovic was interviewed live on the nationwide Top Rated Mancow Radio show after host Mancow Muller discovered LA Pop Art and wanted to share the art with his listeners.

Los Angeles Pop Art was approached in 2010 by Ripley's Believe It or Not! Museums. Ripley's now shows several Los Angeles Pop Art originals in different locations all over the world, spanning from Tokyo to Hollywood, as part of their permanent collection of amazing things.

Also in 2010, Los Angeles Pop Art received 2 awards for vendor excellence from Overstock.com. The first was for Highest Average Partner Scorecard and the other was for Best in Stock % Score in the Clothing and Shoes category.

Los Angeles Pop Art work is published in the Ripley's Believe It or Not Annual 2012 book featuring an illustration based on the Lewis Carroll's novel, Alice's Adventures in Wonderland.

High-profile tourist gift shops, as of 2012, will be supplied by Los Angeles Pop Art with its unique products. Some of the locations include Times Square, Chicago Skydeck, Washington National Cathedral, Abraham Lincoln Presidential Library, The Mob Museum in Las Vegas, Ford's Theatre, Gettysburg Battlefield Museum, Independence Visitors Center, U.S.S. Midway Museum The American Museum of Natural History in NYC, Museum of Science Boston and countless others.

== Licensing ==
=== Acting as a licensee ===
Since its inception, Los Angeles Pop Art has had a strong licensing program, acting as a licensee for some of the world's largest Music and Film Properties.

Properties in which Los Angeles Pop Art has acted as a licensee for include:

- ACDC
- David Bowie
- KISS
- Def Leppard
- ZZ Top
- Nirvana
- Star Trek
- Lyrics to Freebird by Lynyrd Skynyrd
- Scarface
- Bob Marley
- Rocky
- Reservoir Dogs
- The Godfather
- University of Alabama
- Auburn University
- Florida State University
- University of Georgia
- University of Texas at Austin
- Louisiana State University
- University of Miami
- University of Michigan
- University of Tennessee
- University of Wisconsin
- Lyrics to California Dreamin' by The Mamas and Papas
- Lyrics to Dust in The Wind by Kansas
- Lyrics to Born To Be Wild by Steppenwolf
- Lyrics to Viva Las Vegas by Elvis Presley
- Lyrics to Evil Ways by Santana
- Lyrics to Sweet Home Alabama by Lynyrd Skynyrd
- Lyrics to Rock and Roll All Nite by KISS
- Lyrics to Renegades of Funk by Afrika Bambaataa
- Lyrics to Mr. Brightside by The Killers

Studios/Companies in which Los Angeles Pop Art have had licensing partnerships with include:

- Universal Studios
- Paramount Pictures
- The Bob Marley Estate / Fifty Six Hope Street
- Universal Music Group
- EMI
- Warner/Chappell Music
- Pomus Songs
- Collegiate Licensing Company
- CBS Consumer Products
- Lionsgate
- MGM Studios

=== Acting as a licensor ===
With its growing portfolio of original artwork, Los Angeles Pop Art has been building its own licensing program licensing out its original designs to be used on wide variety of products.

Studios/Companies in which Los Angeles Pop Art have licensing original artwork to include:

- Pyramid International
- Bed Bath & Beyond
- Mcgaw Graphics
- Ripple junction
- ZingRevolution.com
- Live Nation / Trunk
- Trends international
- Scorpio posters
- Dragonfly
