= Matthias Buchinger =

German artist, magician, calligrapher and performer

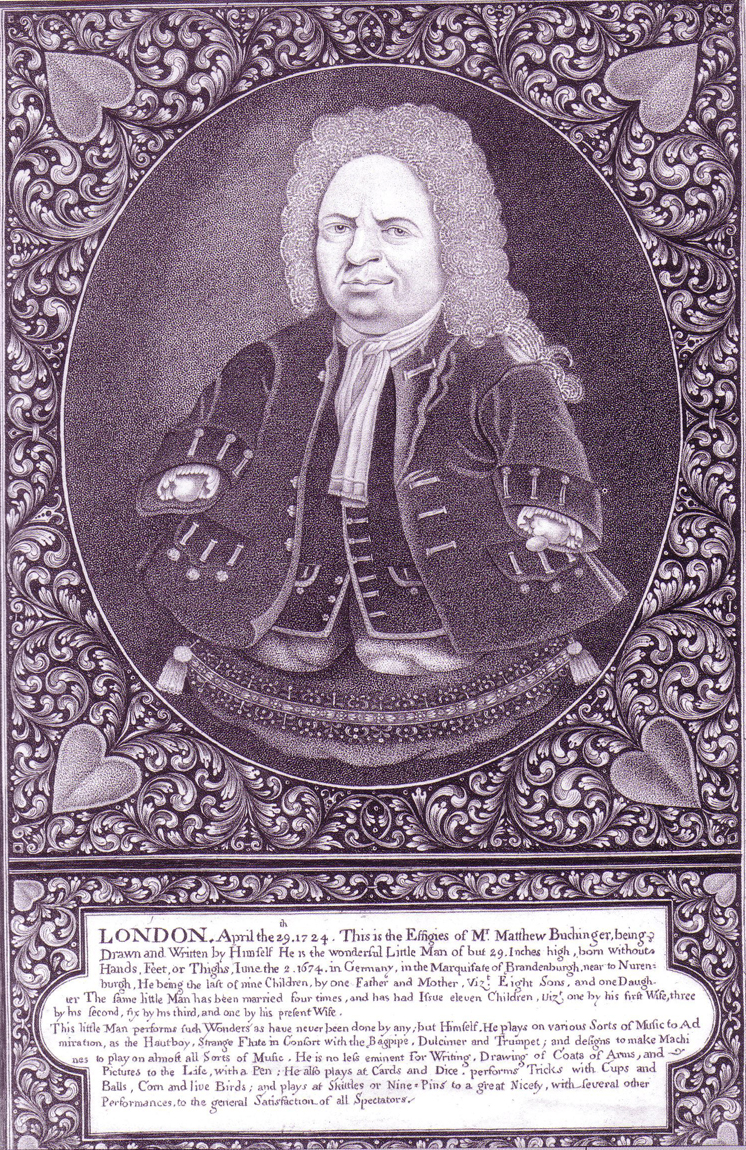
- Self portrait
- Born: June 2, 1674; Ansbach, Principality of Ansbach, Holy Roman Empire
- Died: January 17, 1740 (aged 65); Cork, Kingdom of Ireland
- Occupations: Artist, magician, calligrapher

Matthias Buchinger (German: [maˈtiːas ˈbʊxɪŋɐ]; June 2, 1674 – January 17, 1740), sometimes called Matthew Buckinger in English, was a German artist, magician, calligrapher, and performer who was born without hands or feet and was 2 ft 5 in (74 cm) tall. Buchinger was especially noted for his micrography, in which illustrations consist of very small text.

== Biography ==
Buchinger was born in Ansbach, Holy Roman Empire, without hands or legs, now considered to be phocomelia. An artist and performer, he "traveled all over Northern Europe to entertain kings and aristocrats as well as hoi polloi with amazing feats of physical dexterity" and was known as "The Greatest German Living" and "Little Man from Nuremberg". He travelled to England trying to get a court appointment with King George I, but was unsuccessful; he then moved to Ireland, where he gave public demonstrations in Dublin in 1720 and in Belfast in 1722. He also is rumored to have had children by as many as 70 mistresses. Buchinger's fame was so widespread that in the 1780s the term "Buckinger's boot" existed in England as a euphemism for the vagina (because the only "limb" he had was his penis). Buchinger died in Cork, Ireland, at the age of 65.

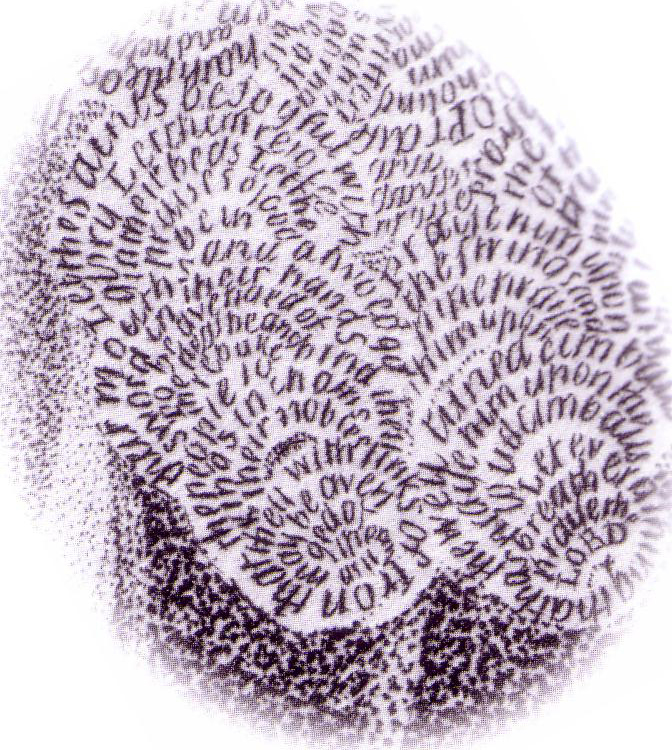
The detailed writing embedded in the engraving

Despite having small, finlike appendages for hands, his engravings were incredibly detailed. One such engraving, a self-portrait, was so detailed that a close examination of the curls of his hair revealed that they were in fact seven biblical psalms and the Lord's Prayer, inscribed in miniature letters.

Buchinger was also an accomplished magician, making balls disappear from under cups and birds to appear from nowhere. It also was said that he was unbeatable at cards and would dazzle audiences with his amazing displays of marksmanship. Buchinger made (or mended) the oldest existing model in a bottle in 1719. It is a model of miners underground and can be seen in Snowshill Manor. He had tremendous dexterity, in spite of his disability.

Buchinger's musical skills included the ability to play a half-dozen musical instruments including the dulcimer, hautboy, trumpet, and flute, and several of his own invention.

== Family ==
Buchinger was married four times and had 14 children. His first three wives (Elsche Shoomaker, Margeth Afsawein, Ann Catharin Kemchmeyer) all died shortly after giving birth and his fourth wife, Ann Elizabeth Teys, outlived him.

== Legacy ==
The Metropolitan Museum of Art presented 16 of his graphic works in a historical show entitled, "Wordplay: Matthias Buchinger's Drawings From the Collection of Ricky Jay". Jay, a magician and "collector of antique marvels", tracked down Buchinger's works for more than 30 years. He chronicled his pursuit of all things Buchinger in a book called Matthias Buchinger: 'The Greatest German Living' by Ricky Jay, Whose Peregrinations in Search of the 'Little Man of Nuremberg' Are Herein Revealed.

An artwork by Buchinger was featured on the BBC television programme, Flog It!, filmed at RAF Hendon (Series 14, Episode 18). The piece sold at Chiswick Auctions in London for £600.

== See also ==
- Micrography
- Phocomelia
