= The Animal in You =

- Author: Roy Feinson
- Language: English, Various
- Subject: Personality Test
- Genre: Psychology, biology
- Publisher: St. Martin's Griffin
- Publication date: 1995
- Publication place: United States
- Media type: Paperback
- ISBN: 978-0312180409
- Followed by: Animal Attraction

The Animal in You is a 1995 non-fiction book by Roy Feinson, which posits a biological basis as to why people tend to exhibit personality traits similar to animal species. The book hypothesizes that through the process of convergent evolution, people adopt a niche set of behaviors enabling them to cope with their particular social milieu in the same way as individual animal species adapt to their environments. The book has been translated into ten different languages, including Mandarin, Japanese, Czech, Hebrew and French, and has been featured on CNN, The Dr. Phil Show and CBS The Talk

== The Personality Test ==
The Animal in You features a personality test of nine questions that collapses to one of 45 possible personality types. After readers answer the questions about their personality and physical attributes, the test returns a number corresponding to one of the 45 animal personality types, appearing in a look-up table. The underlying mechanisms for these types of tests are trivial for modern software based Internet tests, but this is the first known example of a book-based test able to resolve over 20 categories. The test is augmented by an interdependent weighting scheme wherein each question is assigned a different weight depending on how the other questions are answered.

== The Animals ==
The animal personalities are broken down into the broad categories shown below.

=== Carnivores ===
Traits: Powerful, Optimistic, Territorial, Courageous, Fastidious, Athletic, Adventurous, Energetic, Attractive, Fun, Loving, Talented, Flamboyant, World Travelers, Loyal

- Otter
- Wolf
- Sea Lion
- Wild Dog
- Walrus
- Lion
- Shark
- Tiger
- Bear
- Fox
- Wild Cat
- Badger
- Weasel
- Dog.

Optimistic

=== Herbivores ===
Traits: Sociable, Hard Working, Sober, Friendly, Family Oriented, Organized, Reliable, Methodical, Conservative

- Baboon
- Elephant
- Bison
- Giraffe
- Cottontail
- Gorilla
- Deer
- Rhinoceros
- Hippo
- Sable
- Horse
- Sheep
- Mountain Goat
- Warthog
- Zebra.

=== Rodents & Insectivores ===
Traits: Small, Creative, Thrifty, Active, Resilient, Cautious, Socially, loving, Bright

- Mole
- Bat
- Porcupine
- Beaver
- Prairie Dog
- Shrew
- Mouse

=== Birds ===
Traits: Energetic, Attractive, Fun-Loving, Talented, Flamboyant, World Travelers

- Penguin
- Eagle
- Rooster
- Owl
- Swan
- Peacock
- Vulture

=== Reptiles ===
Traits: Artistic Creative Quick Tempered Moody Quirky Unpredictable

- Crocodile
- Snake

== Animal Attraction ==
"Animal Attraction" was a sequel to "Animal In You," published by St. Martin's Griffin Press in 1999. This book explored the types relationships suggested by the different personality types.

== Citations in Academic Articles ==
Pets and People: Companions in Commerce? Holbrook.

Advances in Business Marketing and Purchasing. Wallpach, Woodside.

Are Birds of a Feather Flocking to the Beach? Black.
