= Ellen Frank (artist) =

American artist, writer, and educator

- Born: Ellen Eve Frank; April 26, 1946; Los Angeles, California, United States
- Died: December 16, 2021 (aged 75); New York, NY
- Known for: Graphic arts
- Notable work: Hanukkah Illuminated: A Book of Days; Cities of Peace Illuminated; Literary Architecture: Essays Toward a Tradition

Ellen Eve Frank was an American artist, writer, and educator, based in New York, known for her illuminated manuscripts, which often incorporate precious metals, such as gold leaf, on murals and scrolls, linens and panels. She founded the Ellen Frank Illumination Arts Foundation which promotes the art of illumination and the creation of new works of art in the genre.

== Life ==
Frank was born in Los Angeles and received her Bachelor of Arts degree from the University of California, Los Angeles; her Master of Arts and Ph.D. in literature and visual arts from Stanford and Yale universities, respectively. She was assistant professor of English at the University of California, Berkeley from 1973 to 1977.

Frank is an artist known for her illuminated manuscripts, which showcase the ancient art form of incorporating precious metals like 22-karat gold leaf on murals and scrolls, linens and panels.

Frank has published several written works, among them Literary Architecture: Essays Toward a Tradition (University of California Press) and various other essays on the topics of painting, architecture, and literature. Literary Architecture: Essays Toward a Tradition (University of California Press) has won several awards, including the "Best of All Award Winning Books" by Book Builders West, The Ronce & Coffin Club Design Award, and the New York Institute for Graphic Arts 50 Best Books. She co-wrote a play titled Fridachiapas.net with Maria Pessino who is the founder and director of Oddfellows Productions. The Theatre for the New in New York City hosted the play for its first reading, and Robert Wilson's Watermill Center hosted the second reading in July 1999.

Frank has received various awards and recognition for her work in both painting and writing. She was accepted as a Fulbright Fellow to further her studies in Aesthetic Theory under Sir Ernst Gombrich. Frank also received the Ford Foundation Grant in Lithography, a Pollock-Krasner Award in Painting, and a New York Foundation of the Arts Award in 1997 for her illuminated manuscript. Frank's art has been exhibited throughout the United States, including the Soho Guggenheim to inaugurate "T", where she showed a sequence of 18 paintings. Also, in 1999 J/Brice of Boston, MA commissioned Frank to create an 84-foot mural in copper, gold, and silver leaf on linen.

In 2001, Frank was invited to be Professor and Guest Artist at Barnard College and at Rutgers University.

== Ellen Frank Illumination Arts Foundation, Inc. ==
In 2004, Frank founded the not-for-profit organization, Ellen Frank Illumination Arts Foundation, where she remains as the artistic director. The organization focuses on the art of illumination and the creation of new works of art in this genre. The goal of the Foundation is to revitalize the art form of Illumination, while promoting peace education and bridging religious gaps.

In 2005, the organization created the Illumination Arts Atelier, a workshop that is modeled after the traditional Renaissance ateliers. Accepting interns from South Korea, the United States, Columbia, Japan, and Poland, the atelier teaches the students about manuscript illumination and illuminated painting using 22 karat gold leaf, silver leaf, copper leaf, linen, vellum, paper, papyrus, and egg tempura.

Cities of Peace Illuminated was the first work created at the Illumination Arts Atelier and consists of nine, 6x8 foot paintings that are illuminated with gold. Each of the nine paintings represents a different city that has been traumatized by war and honors the particular city's history and culture. The cities include Beijing, Hiroshima, Kabul, Baghdad, and New York City. Cities of Peace Illuminated premiered in the Laurie M. Tisch Gallery in New York City in 2005. In 2009, it was exhibited in the Cathedral of St. John the Divine in New York City.

== Death ==
Frank died on December 16, 2021, at Mount Sinai Hospital in Manhattan, New York City, at the age of 75. She had been diagnosed with cancer approximately ten weeks before her death.

== Awards and recognition ==
Frank has received awards during her career. They include (in chronological order):

- Ford Foundation Grant, Tamarind Lithography Workshop, 1968.
- Leverhulme Trust Fund Fellow, 1971–1972.
- Fulbright Fellow, London, 1971–1973.
- Fellow, Courtauld and Warburg Institutes, 1973.
- National Endowment Matching Grant (Pequod) 1982, 1981, 1980, 1979.
- C.C.L.M. Award (Pequod: A Journal of Contemporary Literature), 1982, 1981, 1980, 1979.
- Bookbuilders' West, "Best of Show," 1980.
- Rounce Coffin Distinguished Books Award, 1980.
- American Institute of Graphic Arts, "50 Best Books," 1981.
- "Highest Excellence in 50 Years," University of California Press, 1986.
- Pollock-Krasner Foundation Award in Painting, 1986.
- Al Young Distinguished Artist, Knox College, Galesburg, IL, 1989.
- New York Foundation for the Arts Award for Hanukkah Illuminated: A Book of Days, 1996.
- Jump Start the Arts Ninbark International, NYSCA & Consortium of Arts Councils, 1999.
- Individual Artist Award for Illumination Atelier Project, New York State Council for the Arts, 2000.
- New York State Council for the Arts, Ninbark International, 2000, 2001.

Frank and her foundation, have been featured in many newspapers, including The New York Times, Southampton Press and, The East Hampton Star
