= Impressionist mosaics =

La Scapigliata in Carnelian, with close-up of mouth. (Roy Feinson)

Unlike traditional mosaics which rely on differently colored material arranged in arbitrary configurations to make an image, impressionist mosaics are created using the natural flaws and marbling in the tiles to create the impression of an image. Depending on the definition, this may be limited to arranging square, homogeneously colored tiles in a grid-like, non-overlapped fashion.

Using stones that are of relatively uniform color and texture (typically pre-cut natural gemstones such as jasper, marble, or amethyst), the resulting mosaics have a uniquely ethereal quality that distinguishes them from traditional processes. Since the technique uses uniformly cut stones, it does not require grouting.

== Process ==
By Roy Feinson's definition, impressionist mosaics are created by taking dozens of measurements of every tile in the artist's "palette". The measurements are obtained by digitally photographing each tile and separating it into a grid of sixteen equal sections and analyzing each section for color, contrast and marbling. The resultant data are stored in a database and operated on by proprietary software, which recommends placements for all the tiles. Since the tiles are generally square, the software considers all four possible rotations for each tile, which greatly increases the odds that a given tile will find a good 'home'. Each tile is equivalent to sixteen pixels in the final mosaic since its final location is a function of sixteen sections. While the software is an important component of this process, the artist must still rely on traditional hand-eye techniques to complete the image. Care must be taken to balance the color curves in the target image to that of the component tiles. For example, if the darkest color to be found on any of the component tiles is only a mid-tone gray, then any blacks in the target image's must be converted to mid-tone gray. This process would be repeated for the reds, greens, blues, and whites.

== Differences from traditional mosaics ==
Traditional mosaics have a history dating back to at least the fourth century BC, and employ a variety of methodologies to create their images. However, traditional mosaics share the common feature of employing small, uniformly colored materials (tesserae) to create a pattern or picture. Because the tiles can be cut into irregular shapes to conform to the base pattern, mosaicists are able to create works of astonishing detail and color.

Alternatively, pixel tile mosaics, such as those found on the floor of the University of Toronto pool, employ standard sized tiles (generally 1 x 1 or 2 by 2 inch) in a variety of colors arranged in a uniform matrix. Each tile is a different color and represents a single 'pixel' in the final image. The resulting mosaic is typically coarse and of very low resolution.

== History ==
Pioneering work in this field was conducted in the 1990s by California mosaic artist Roy Feinson, who because of its underlying similarities to 19th century impressionism coined the term Impressionist Mosaics.

In 2006, mosaic artists Nick Berg and Alan Roth made custom mosaics using this technique commercially available in marble and wood. Because of the increased image resolution inherent in the impressionist mosaic process, they coined the terms High Definition Mosaics and Photo-realistic Mosaics.
