= The Noun Project =

Website that aggregates and catalogs symbols

- The Noun Project logo showing representations of a person, place and thing
- Website type: Graphic arts library
- Available in: English + 24 others
- Owners: The Noun Project, Inc.
- Website: thenounproject.com
- Commercial: yes
- Registration: required
- Launched: December 2010
- Content license: Creative Commons/Royalty-free | Icons: Public Domain/CC-BY, Images: Public Domain/CC-BY-NC-ND

"Global Warming" by Luis Prado

"Human rights" designed in collaboration by Phoebe Sexton, Vincent Zhang, Russell Lord, Scott Thomas, Edward Boatman and Sofya Polyakov

"Food bank" by Edward Boatman

The Noun Project is a website that aggregates and catalogs symbols that are created and uploaded by graphic designers around the world. Based in Los Angeles, the project functions both as a resource for people in search of typographic symbols and a design history of the genre.

== History ==
The Noun Project was co-founded by Sofya Polyakov, Edward Boatman, and Scott Thomas and is headed by Polyakov. Boatman recalled his frustration while working at an architectural firm at the lack of a central repository for common icons, "things such as airplanes, bicycles and people." That idea morphed into a broader platform for visual communication. The site was launched on Kickstarter in December 2010, which raised more than $14,000 in donations, with symbols from the National Park Service and other sources whose content was in the public domain. Site design was by the firm Simple.Honest.Work, with mentoring from the Designer Fund.

The Noun Project has generated interest and new symbols by hosting a series of "Iconathons", the first of which was held in the summer of 2011. The sessions typically run five hours and include graphic designers, content experts, and interested volunteers, all working in small groups that focus on a specific issue, such as democracy, transportation or nutrition. The idea for the event came from Chacha Sikes, who was at the time a fellow at Code for America.

== Operation ==
Contributors come from around the world. A 2012 New York Times story profiled one of them: Luis Prado, a graphic designer at the Washington State Department of Natural Resources, who uploaded 83 icons he had created for his agency, including a pruning saw, a logging truck and a candidate symbol for global warming, which he created when he could not find one online.

The site has four stylistic guidelines: include only the essential characteristics of the idea conveyed, maintain a consistent design style, favor an industrial look over a hand-drawn one, and avoid conveying personal opinions, feelings and beliefs. Contributors select a public domain mark or a Creative Commons attribution license, which enables others to use the symbol with attribution, free of charge. The attribution requirement can be waived upon payment of a nominal fee, which is split between the artist and The Noun Project. The founders envisioned the site as being primarily useful for designers and architects, but the range of users includes people with autism and amyotrophic lateral sclerosis, who sometimes favor a visual language, as well as business professionals incorporating the symbols into presentations.
