= Lincoln in Dalivision =

1977 painting by Salvador Dalí

- Artist: Salvador Dalí
- Year: 1977
- Location: Two originals: - Dalí Theatre and Museum, Figueres, Spain - Salvador Dalí Museum, St. Petersburg, Florida, United States

Lincoln in Dalivision

Lincoln in Dalivision is a 1977 original limited edition lithograph created by Salvador Dalí. It is often considered one of the most counterfeited Dalí lithographs. Dalí authentication experts who have noted the counterfeiting issue with this work include Albert Field (The Official Catalog of Graphic Works of Salvador Dalí – authorized by Dalí), Frank Hunter (Dalí Archives – authorized by Dalí), Robert Descharnes (French photographer, long-term friend and associate of Salvador Dalí) and Bernard Ewell (Bernard Ewell Art Appraisals, LLC). Lee Catterall comments in his book The Great Dalí Art Fraud & other deceptions, "The painting most commonly reproduced for such fraudulent purposes was Lincoln in Dalivision, 'prints' of which Los Angeles art appraiser Dena Hall testified in the Hawaii trial have become as commonplace as 'pancakes at the pancake house.'"

Lincoln in Dalivision was created based on the Dalí painting Gala Contemplating the Mediterranean Sea which at a distance of 20 meters is transformed into the portrait of Abraham Lincoln (Homage to Rothko). Dalí painted two original versions of this painting spanning from 1974 – 1976, which are similar but not exactly the same. The first resides in the Dalí Theatre and Museum in Figueres, Spain. The second resides in the permanent collection of The Salvador Dalí Museum in St. Petersburg, Florida. This painting is the basis for the Lincoln in Dalivision lithograph. Prior to the acquisition by The Salvador Dalí Museum, the painting resided in Japan. The second version was exhibited for the first time at the Guggenheim Museum in the summer of 1976.

== Significance ==
Dalí's paintings Gala Contemplating the Mediterranean Sea which at a distance of 20 meters is transformed into the portrait of Abraham Lincoln (Homage to Rothko), and the original Lincoln in Dalivision lithographs produced from these paintings were some of the first examples of the photomosaic artistic approach by a recognized artist. "The Recognition of Faces," by Leon Harmon, was the first published work on photomosaic concepts. Harmon was a Bell Labs researcher who had been developing this concept, and the first image in this article was the well-recognized portrait of Abraham Lincoln from the U.S. five dollar bill made from a collection of solid gray mosaics. Dalí began his first painting that led to Lincoln in Dalivision in 1974 and finished the version that would be used for Lincoln in Dalivision in 1976. Harmon's Lincoln mosaic was the basis for all of Dalí's Lincoln photomosaics, which is evident by comparing the solid gray mosaics from Harmon's paper and the final works of art by Dalí.

The first painting was completed in 1976 and displayed at The Guggenheim in New York during the U.S. Bicentennial in 1976. Lincoln in Dalivision was originally intended for release in the same year, but was not finalized until 1977.

== Published editions ==
Lincoln in Dalivision was primarily published by Levine & Levine in New York in 1977. All editions were signed and numbered. Total production was 1240 "lithographs" in the following editions:

- 1 – 350 on Arches paper [Distributed by Martin Lawrence Limited Editions, Van Nuys, California, i.e. American Edition]
- E1/350 – E350/350 on Arches paper [European Edition]
- G1/125 – G125/125 (Publisher Grafos Verlag, Vaduz, Germany)
- EA1/75 – EA75/75 on Japon paper [épreuve d'artiste, i.e. Artist's Print]
- AP1/75 – AP75/75 on Japon paper [Artist's Print]
- HC 65 [hors de commerce, i.e. not for sale] – 65 numbered 1/65-65/65 and used mainly for promotional purposes
- I/CC – CC/CC on Arches paper

The prints were originally sold at a price of $750 and a small viewing optic lens in a blue case was included with the purchase. While viewing photomosaics by squinting the eyes is common today, the optic piece was included to help viewers see the Lincoln illusion from close range.

Due to the extensive counterfeiting and forgeries of Dalí's signature, Lincoln in Dalivision, expert authentication is usually required to confirm the authenticity of this work. Many experts who can typically authenticate various works via pictures and measurements only, require viewing Lincoln in Dalivision in person before they will authenticate the piece. Frank Hunter of the Dalí Archives requires that he views this work in person before providing a statement of authenticity.

Despite an edition of 1,240, Lincoln in Dalivision has appeared relatively infrequently at major auctions. Artnet.com records only a limited number of auction sales of the work over the past decade.

Respected galleries, including The Salvador Dalí Gallery (California) do list Lincoln in Dalivision in their inventory from time to time. Prices for authenticated works are often listed at prices ranging from $10,000 to $15,000 (per a search of publicly displayed prices on gallery websites completed in 2012). Those with authentication by Albert Field or Frank Hunter appear to carry a slight premium in pricing to other pieces deemed authentic by galleries or other authentication experts.

Lincoln in Dalivision is often referred to as a "print" or "lithograph." However, neither of these are technically correct, as these terms have specific meanings when referring to original works of art that are created in limited editions. Lincoln in Dalivision is truly a mixed media artwork. It is technically a photolith with original etched remarque (Torrents) and embossing. While the photolith is from the painting, the etched remarque and embossing makes Lincoln in Dalivision an original Dalí. Additionally, the signature of Dalí and the numbering of the limited editions also establishes these works as originals. Lincoln in Dalivision is listed in Albert Field's The Official Catalog of Graphic Works of Salvador Dalí – authorized by Dalí as an original work and is viewed as such by galleries worldwide.

== See also ==
- List of works by Salvador Dalí
