= Holography art =

Art technique using holography

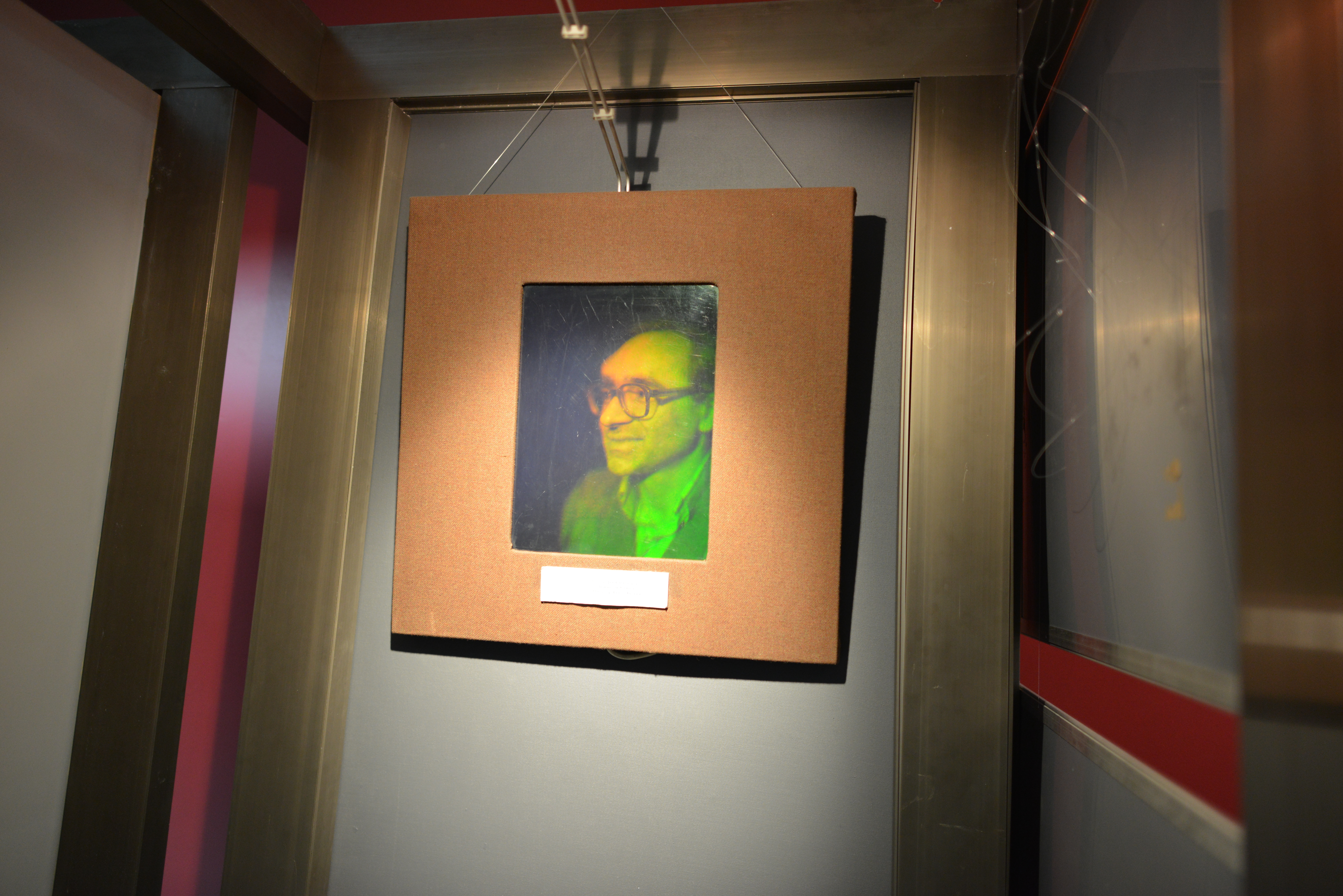
Holographic self-portrait of Ventseslav Saynov

Holography Art is a genre of artistic expression that leverages the scientific principles of holography, first conceptualized by physicist Dennis Gabor in 1947.

== History ==
In 1960, the development of the laser beam enabled the advancement of this technique. In 1968, Stephen A. Benton invented the reflection hologram, which is very bright and visible under white light.

The first exhibition took place in 1968 in Michigan, followed by another in New York in 1970. The movement gained momentum in the 1970s, particularly in the United States, Canada, Japan, and Germany.

== Icologram ==
Since 2018, the term "icologram" has emerged to more accurately describe recording and projections of people often mistakenly referred to as holograms in mainstream media. An icologram combines "icon" (the subject) and "hologram" (the projection technology). This technique uses scene and/or volumetric capture along with spatial computing and extended reality (XR) technologies to create a "digital twin" of a person, enabling new performances by digitally captured artists. The term aims to distinguish these projections from true holograms as defined by Dennis Gabor's original works. The icologram represents a significant advancement in holographic art, offering new possibilities for artistic creation and performance dissemination. This protocol allows the essence of an artist or character to be preserved and reproduced, paving the way for unprecedented immersive experiences in the fields of performance art and Art Tech.

== Techniques ==
Holograms are created through the interference of two laser beams. These interferences are recorded on film, which is then developed similarly to analog photography. There are two main types: transmission holography and reflection holography, depending on the relative positions of the object, lasers, and film.

== Characteristics ==
Holographic images often feature rainbow-like gradients, resulting from the decomposition of white light. However, achromatic holograms (black and white) can also be produced. An analog image and three-dimensional photograph, a hologram gives density to light, emphasizing the three-dimensionality of the object by retaining only its luminous essence. The holographic image conveys a transparent, spectral vision of objects or humans. Due to its three-dimensional nature, a hologram appears both realistic and ghostly, much like 19th-century stereoscopic photography.

== Applications ==
Holography has been embraced in various artistic fields, including cinema, video, computer graphics, photography, installations, and light shows. Holographic art has seen significant development in the United States, the UK, Japan, and Canada.

== Examples ==
Artist Dean Randazzo combines photography, film, and computer-generated images to create complex holographic forms where movement and transformation are central to his works.

Paul Newman experiments with laser beams projected through different types of striped and broken lenses, creating new and unpredictable experimental images.

Georges Dyens integrates holography with sculpture, video, music, laser, and smoke. In one exhibition, viewers are invited to walk along a "line of fire" to experience the juxtaposition of photographs and holograms, immersed in an ambiance created by special lighting—a reflection of the soul and flames, symbolizing energy and vitality.
