= Micrography =

Art genre using minute Hebrew letters

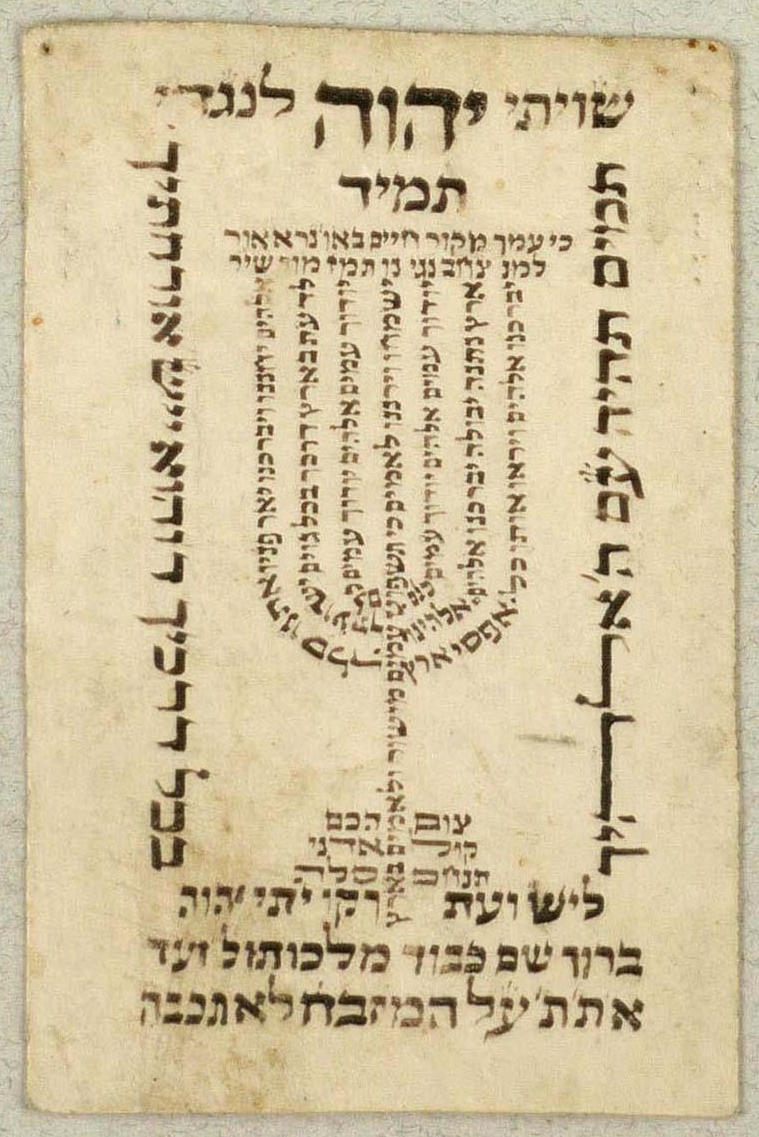
A shiviti from Denmark, with Hebrew text in the shape of a menorah.

Micrography (from Greek, literally small-writing – "Μικρογραφία"), also called microcalligraphy, is a Jewish form of calligrams developed in the 9th century, with parallels in Christianity and Islam, utilizing minute Hebrew letters to form representational, geometric and abstract designs. Colored micrography is especially distinctive because these rare artworks are customarily rendered in black and white.

== Description ==
The artwork is created from text that forms an image when viewed at a distance, creating an interplay between the text and image. The photomosaic, whose tiny individual images form a mosaic when viewed from a distance, is a modern analogue. Another modern analogue is ASCII art, where ASCII or extended ASCII characters are arranged to form an image on a computer screen and/or printout.

== Motivation ==
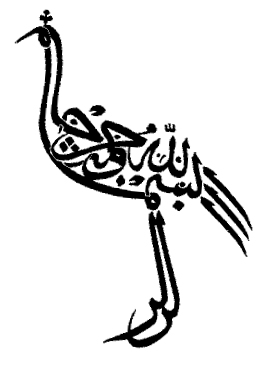
An Arabic calligram in the form of a peacock.

There is a relationship between this form of art, employing both digital and analogic symbols, and the restrictions on images found in the second commandment. Micrography provides a unique solution to the visual artist who wishes to remain devout in observation of Jewish law, by using only text, not images per se. As similar restrictions exist in certain Muslim societies, this solution has been adapted in Islamic calligraphy to the Arabic alphabet as well.

== See also ==
- Matthias Buchinger
- Los Angeles Pop Art
