= Roy Feinson =

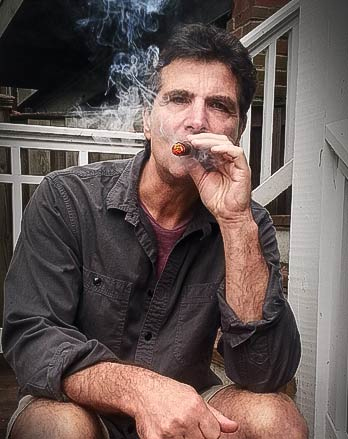
- Roy Feinson
- Born: 1957 (age 68–69); Port Elizabeth, South Africa
- Occupation: Visual software engineer · Author · Mosaic artist
- Known for: Predictive-text patent; “impressionist mosaics”
- Notable work: The Animal in You; Official Artist Disneyland Happiest Faces on Earth; Official 50th Anniversary Grammy Artist
- Website: royfeinson.com

La Scapigliata in Carnelian, with close-up of mouth.

Roy Feinson is a South African born software engineer, author, and international mosaic artist who patented the first fully functional predictive text system that included disambiguation and local dictionary storage.

Founder and President of EmergeX.AI, Doubletake Images LLC, and Orb Reality LLC; D.C. based software firms, Feinson holds a number of computer-technology patents and his scientific applications deal with artificial life, artificial intelligence and forensic image analysis and his model of animal vision was recently presented to scientists at N.I.S.T. One of the original pioneers in the field of photographic mosaics, he is credited for creating the genre known as impressionist mosaics in which the imperfections of natural materials such as turquoise or marble are organized to create ethereal imagery.

Feinson is the author of three books focused on the evolutionary underpinnings of human behavior. His books have been translated into ten different languages including Mandarin, Japanese, Czech, Hebrew and French, and has been featured on CNN, The Dr. Phil Show and CBS The Talk

Feinson's novel theory of animal vision, The Zebra's Stripes, was presented to scientists at the National Institute for Standards and Technology in 2013 and addresses many unanswered questions in the field of animal behavior and camouflage.

Feinson is the son of Sidney Feinson, a World War II veteran who escaped German captivity and made his way to Switzerland. His escape has been detailed in books and his story was the spark for the Red Socks Friday movement.

== Installations and awards ==
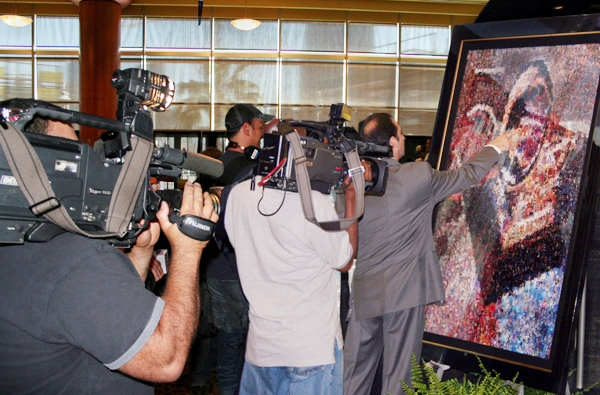
Unveiling of Grammy Awards 50th Anniversary artwork

2000: Winner of C-Span Presidential Art Contest.

In 2006, Feinson was the featured artist for Disneyland's 49th Anniversary, where he created the largest photographic mosaic ever made, spanning over 10,000 square feet and featuring live performers carrying photographs of themselves and other cast members.

In 2007, Feinson was commissioned to create a series of 38 large-scale mosaic works for Disney's 50th anniversary's celebration, the Happiest Homecoming on Earth. A special feature, installed near the park's town hall, was the world's first tri-level mosaic; a giant mosaic of Mickey Mouse in Steamboat Willie made up of 1,000 portraits of Disney cast members, which in turn were mosaics composed of 600,000 photographs submitted by park guests.

In 2008, Feinson was selected as the featured artist for the Grammy Awards 50th anniversary. The artwork was unveiled by Quincy Jones, Joss Stone and Recording Academy President Neil Portnow who called Feinson "a true artistic innovator, and.. renaissance man". The Grammy artwork is part of the permanent collection at the Grammy museum in Los Angeles.

2009: Winner New York Times original science riddle.

In 2014, Feinson was selected as the official artist for the 15th anniversary of the Latin Grammys.

== Other installations ==
Honolulu International Airport
Martin Luther King District
Pentagon. Operation Grateful Nation
Detroit Zoo
Lurie Children's Hospital Chicago
Detroit Children's Hospital

== Bibliography ==
- The Animal in You.(St. Martins Press)1998
- Das Tier in dir. (Broschiert)1999
- Animal Attraction. (St. Martins Press)1999
- The Secret Universe of Names (Overlook/Penguin)2004

== Patents ==
- Interpretive tone telecommunication method and apparatus. Status: Granted. Patent Number US4754474A
- System and Method for Facilitating Affective-State-Based Artificial Intelligence. Publication Number: 20190236464. Status: Pending.
- Surround video playback: Status: Granted. Patent number: 8867886
- Surround Video Recording: Publication number: 20120307068. Status: Granted.
- Methods and Systems for Navigating Autonomous and Semi-Autonomous Vehicles. U.S. patent application 16/584566
- Antibodies Directed to Filamin-A and Therapeutic Uses Thereof U.S. Publication WO/2020/076954

== See also ==
- Impressionist mosaics
- Photographic mosaic
- Animal in You
- Happiest Homecoming on Earth
