= Leon Harmon =

Leon D. Harmon (1922–1983) was a researcher in mental/neural processing, particularly regarding vision, who worked at Bell Telephone Laboratories, Incorporated.

Harmon started his career as a radio serviceman and electronics hobbyist. In 1950, he went to work as a wireman on the IAS machine at the Institute for Advanced Study, where he worked for Julian Bigelow and encountered John von Neumann and Albert Einstein. At the same time he began taking night courses in engineering at New York University. When the IAS project ended in 1956, he joined Bell Laboratories where he worked on human perception, computer vision and graphics.

In 1966, Harmon and Kenneth C. Knowlton were experimenting with photomosaic, creating large prints from collections of small symbols or images. In Studies in Perception I they created an image of a reclining nude (the dancer Deborah Hay), by scanning a photograph with a camera and converting the analog voltages to binary numbers which were assigned typographic symbols based on halftone densities. It was printed in The New York Times on 11 October 1967, and exhibited as part of the Experiments in Art and Technology (EAT) competition at, The Machine as Seen at the End of the Mechanical Age, held at the Museum of Modern Art in New York City from November 25, 1968 through February 9, 1969. Knowlton characterized it as a "sophomoric prank."

Harmon is best known for his highly pixelated, block portrait of Abraham Lincoln from the five dollar bill. It was created to illustrate his November, 1973, Scientific American article, "The Recognition of Faces." In 1976, Salvador Dalí used Harmon's image as the basis of his Gala Contemplating the Mediterranean Sea and Lincoln in Dalivision.

Around 1973, Harmon went to the Department of Biomedical Engineering at Case Western Reserve University, and became the head of that department. During this time, he conducted studies on facial recognition, as well as robotic control. He supervised one graduate student, Thomas F. Collura, who received his Ph.D. in 1978 for studying brainwave (EEG) signatures of attention in human subjects, using an analog computer. Harmon served in the department, having stepped down as head in 1976 to become professor, until his passing in 1983.

== Publications ==
- Goldstein, A. J., Harmon, L. D. and Lesk, A. B. (1971). Identification of Human Faces. Proceedings of the IEEE, 59(5):748-760.
- Goldstein, A. J., Harmon, L. D. and Lesk, A. B. (1972). Man-Machine Interaction in Human-Face Identification. Bell Syst. Tech. J., 51(2):399-427.
- Harmon, L. D. (1972). Automatic Recognition of Print and Script. Proceedings of the IEEE (60), No. 10, October 1972, pp. 1165–1177.
- K. Knowlton and L. Harmon, "Computer-Produced Greyscales," Computer Graphics and Image Processing No. 1, 1972, pp. 1–20.
- Harmon, L. D. and Julesz, B. (1973). Masking in Visual Recognition: Effects of Two-Dimensional Filtered Noise. Science (1973 Jun 15) 180:1194–1197
- Harmon, L. D. (1973). The Recognition of Faces. Scientific American (1973 Nov) 229(5):71-82
- Harmon, L. D., Kuo, S. C., Ramig, P.F. and Raudkivi, U. (1978): Identification of human face profiles by computer. Pattern Recognition 10(5-6): 301-312
- Harmon, L. D. and Hunt, W. F. (1978). Automatic Recognition of Human Face Profiles. Computer Graphics and Image Processing, 6(2):135-156.
- Harmon, L. D., Khan, M. K., Lasch, R., and Ramig, P.F. (1981). Machine Identification of Human Faces. Pattern Recognition, 13(2):97-110.
