= Photographic mosaic =

Mosaic composed of smaller photographs

A photographic mosaic of the 1911 painting by Franz Marc, Blue Horse I

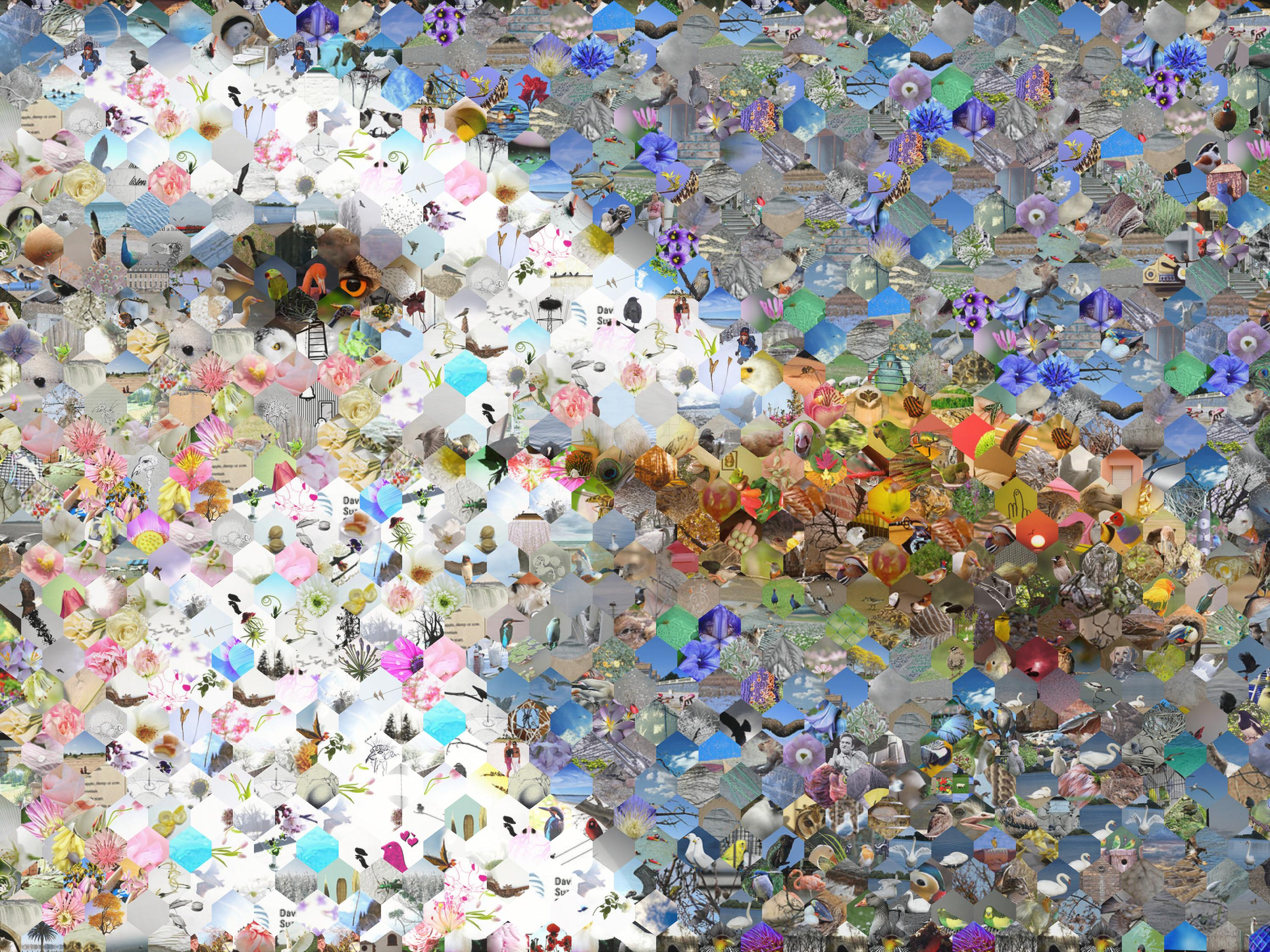
A photographic mosaic of a sea gull made from pictures of birds and other nature photos using hexagonal tiles

A photographic mosaic or photomosaic is a picture (usually a photograph) that has been divided into tiled sections, usually equal sized, each of which is replaced with another photograph that matches the target photo. When viewed at low magnifications, the individual pixels appear as the primary image, while close examination reveals that the image is in fact made up of many hundreds or thousands of smaller images. Most of the time they are a computer-created type of montage.

There are two kinds of mosaic, depending on how the matching is done. In the simpler kind, each part of the target image is averaged down to a single color. Each of the library images is also reduced to a single color. Each part of the target image is then replaced with one from the library where these colors are as similar as possible. In effect, the target image is reduced in resolution (by downsampling), and then each of the resulting pixels is replaced with an image whose average color matches that pixel.

In the more advanced kind of photographic mosaic, the target image is not downsampled, and the matching is done by comparing each pixel in the rectangle to the corresponding pixel from each library image. The rectangle in the target is then replaced with the library image that minimizes the total difference. This requires much more computation than the simple kind, but the results can be much better since the pixel-by-pixel matching can preserve the resolution of the target image.

== History ==
1993 Live from Bell Labs event poster

- 1973 Leon Harmon publishes The Recognition of Faces. It is illustrated with a very pixelated version of the portrait of Abraham Lincoln in the 5-dollar bill.
- 1974-1976 Salvador Dalí paints two versions of Gala Contemplating the Mediterranean Sea which at a distance of 20 meters is transformed into the portrait of Abraham Lincoln (Homage to Rothko). The gray blocks in Harmon's portrait are substituted by square-shaped subpictures forming the image of a nude Gala Dalí looking through a window.
- 1977 Dalí prints a lithograph Lincoln in Dalivision based in his previous paintings.
- 1993 Joseph Francis, working for R/Greenberg Associates in Manhattan, is believed to be the inventor of the modern-day computer-generated colour image versions. His Live from Bell Labs poster created in 1993 used computer-themed tile photographs to create a mosaic of a face (Ryszard Horowitz/ Photography and Art Direction, Robert Bowen/ Digital Artist). He went on to create a mosaic for Animation Magazine in 1993, which was repeated in Wired Magazine (November 1994, p. 106). Francis has said on his "History of Photo Mosaics" webpage that his interest in developing these techniques further was in part stimulated by the work of artist Chuck Close.
- 1994 Dave McKean creates an image for DC Comics, a mosaic of a face made from photos of faces, although this is believed to be created manually using Photoshop.
- 1994 Adam Finkelstein and Sandy Farrier create a mosaic of John F. Kennedy from parts of Marilyn Monroe pictures. The result was displayed in the Xerox PARC Algorithmic Art Show in 1994.
- 1994 Benetton: AIDS - Faces mosaic. Over one thousand young peoples' portraits from all over the word computer-processed spell out the word AIDS.
- 1995 The Gioconda Sapiens, a face with ten thousand faces, was presented to the public in April 1995 (Spain, Domus museum). This was the first large photographic mosaic, using photographs of 10,062 people from 110 countries to make the Mona Lisa.
- 1995 Adam Finkelstein (published mosaic in Mossy Bits) creates a mosaic of the 1930 oil painting by Grant Wood, American Gothic, from images collected from the Web in early 1995.
- 1995 Robert Silvers creates an algorithm for generating Photomosaics programmatically and goes on to trademark the term Photomosaic and patent his process for creation of Photomosaics in 1997. The name Photomosaic and an implementation concept were trademarked by Robert Silvers' Runaway Technology, Inc.

== Artistic aspects ==
There is debate over whether Photomosaics are an art or mere technique. The making of a photomosaic is sometimes parallelled and compared to forms of artistic appropriation, like literary assemblage.

Artists such as David Hockney, Christopher Kates and Pep Ventosa have pioneered their own photographic mosaic techniques where multiple photographs are taken of a scene and then pieced together again to create a cohesive image.

== Trademark and intellectual property of the concept ==
Robert Silvers, a Master's student at MIT, filed for a trademark on the term Photomosaic on September 3, 1996. This trademark was registered on August 12, 2003.

Silvers also applied for a U.S. patent on the production of Photomosaics on January 2, 1997, which was granted as US 6137498 in October 2000 and has been assigned to Runaway Technology, Inc. Patent applications in other countries were also filed, and patents granted include EP 0852363, JP 10269353, CA 2226059, and AU 723815B. He is quoted as saying: "By being granted this patent in the United States and other countries, we can protect our proprietary innovations and continue to make unique artwork." In September 2008, the Public Patent Foundation filed a formal request with the United States Patent and Trademark Office (USPTO) to review certain claims in the US 6137498 on photomosaics. The request was granted and a reexamination proceeding ensued. On August 31, 2010, the USPTO issued a Reexamination Certificate confirming the patentability of all claims in the patent which were amended to refer to shape matching (a feature that contributes to the high resolution of photomosaics).

There are a number of other commercial companies that create mosaics with photos. Since there has been no litigation of these patents, these companies must therefore either use processes that do not infringe on the particular claimed process, have licenses under the patents, or are infringing those patents but Runaway Technology has chosen not to bring infringement proceedings.

Silvers' patent may be regarded as a software patent, a subject over which there is a great deal of debate. For example, Article 52(2)(c) EPC states that "programs for computers as such" are not regarded as patentable inventions. Nevertheless, current practice relating to computer-implemented inventions under the EPC means that a process that provides a technical effect may be patented even if it is implemented by a computer.

The UK patent deriving from EP 0852363 became the subject of revocation proceedings in July 2006. In September 2009, the UK Intellectual Property Office (UK-IPO) decided that the patent should not be revoked and terminated the proceeding. The European patents expired on 31 December 2017.

== Video mosaic ==
Photographic mosaics are typically formed from a collection of still images. A more recent phenomenon, however, has been video mosaics which assemble video clips rather than still images to create a larger image. The closing credits of the 2005 PlayStation 2 game God of War, for example, incorporates a still image of the main character, Kratos, formed from a number of in-game videos.

The term "video mosaic" also describes a large still image made from adjacent frames of video, such as those from video shots of geographic features like roads or cities. A mosaic of the video's relevant frames replaces the full video, saving time and bandwidth, since the stills are much smaller.

== See also ==
- ASCII art
- Impressionist mosaics
- Micrography
- Omnidirectional camera
- Substitution tiling
- Wikimedia logo mosaic
