= Stan Vanderbeek =

American film director (1927–1984)

Stan Vanderbeek in front of his Movie Drome theater at Stony Point, New York

Stan Vanderbeek (also VanDerBeek; January 6, 1927, New York City – September 19, 1984, Baltimore) was an American independent animator, experimental filmmaker, and art theoretician known for his collage works and his early use of the digital computer as a creative medium. His Movie Drome theater was a grain silo dome or geodesic dome where he showed 16mm films mixed with 35mm slides, video and digital animations.

== Life ==
Vanderbeek studied art and architecture at Manhattan's Cooper Union before transferring to Black Mountain College in North Carolina, where he met polymath Buckminster Fuller, composer John Cage, and choreographer Merce Cunningham. Beginning in 1949, he took two terms of photography courses from Hazel Larsen Archer at the institution.

In the 1950s, he directed independent art films while learning animation techniques and painting scenery and set designs for Winky Dink and You. His earliest films, made between 1955 and 1965, mostly consist of animated paintings and collage films, combined in a form of organic development (including his 1959 short Science Friction).

Vanderbeek's ironic compositions were created very much in the spirit of the surreal and Dadaist collages of Max Ernst, but with a wild, rough informality more akin to the expressionism of the Beat Generation.

In the 1960s, Vanderbeek began working with Claes Oldenburg and Jim Dine, as well as representatives of modern dance and expanded cinema including Merce Cunningham and Elaine Summers. Contemporaneously, he designed shows using multiple projectors at his Movie Drome theater at Stony Point, New York. The Movie Drome was a grain silo dome which he turned into his "infinite projection screen." In a letter to the Rockefeller Foundation fielding support for the Movie Drome, he wrote: "The most important concept of this ‘experience machine is to make the world audience ‘self’ conscious of itself, which I think is an essential step in the bringing about of peaceful co-existence." Visitors entered the dome through a trap-door in the floor, and were encouraged after entering to spread out over the floor and lie with their feet pointing towards the center. Once inside, the audience experienced a dynamic inter-dispersal of movies and images around them, created by over a dozen slide and film projectors filling the concave surface with a dense collage of moving imagery. These presentations contained a very great number of random image sequences and continuities, with the result that none of the performances were alike.

His desire for the utopian led him to collaborate with Ken Knowlton at Bell Labs, where dozens of computer-animated films and holographic experiments were created by the end of the 1960s. These included Poem Field (1964-1968), a series of eight computer animations.

During the same period, he taught at many universities, researching new methods of representation, from the steam projections at the Guggenheim Museum to the interactive television transmissions of his Violence Sonata, broadcast on several channels in 1970. He directed the University of Maryland, Baltimore County visual arts program until his death.

== Family ==
He had two children (August, Maximus) from his marriage to Johanna Vanderbeek. Three additional children from his second marriage to Louise Vanderbeek are Julia Vanderbeek and artists Sara Vanderbeek and Johannes Vanderbeek.

== Legacy ==
His movie Breathdeath (1963) was a huge influence on Terry Gilliam (who, nonetheless, once mistakenly referred to it as Death Breath).

Vanderbeek's work and legacy have been the focus of several retrospective exhibitions, including:

- Amazement Park: Stan, Sara and Johannes VanDerBeek (2009) at The Frances Young Tang Teaching Museum and Art Gallery at Skidmore College, Saratoga Springs, NY
- Stan VanDerBeek – The Cultural Intercom (2011) at MIT List Visual Arts Center, Cambridge, MA (traveled to Museum of Contemporary Art, Houston, TX)
- Jon Rafman / Stan VanDerBeek (2017) at Sprüth Magers, Los Angeles, CA, curated by Johannes Fricke Waldthausen
- VanDerBeek + VanDerBeek (2019) at Black Mountain College Museum + Arts Center, co-curated by Sara VanDerBeek and Chelsea Spengemann, Director of the Stan VanDerBeek Archive.

The VanDerBeek Archive is represented by the New York City gallery Magenta Plains. In 2023, Magenta Plains hosted See Saw Seems, its first solo exhibition of Stan Vanderbeek's work, showcasing his historical collage animation films from 1960 to 1965. In 2024, Magenta Plains presented Transmissions, showcasing the artist’s collages, drawings, and films. A central work within the exhibition was Panels for the Walls of the World: Phase II, consisting of two 20-foot-long fax murals created by Vanderbeek in the spring of 1970 during his residency at MIT’s Center for Advanced Visual Studies.

Hyperallergic highlighted the work in their review of Transmissions, noting "Like the best of the artist’s work, “Panels for the Walls of the World” is an exercise in self-transcendence, an attempt at vaulting cognition beyond the body’s traditional borders."

== Public collections ==
Stan Vanderbeek's work is featured in the collections of:

- The Arts Council of Great Britain, London, UK
- The Art Institute of Chicago, Chicago, IL
- Centre Pompidou, Paris, FR
- Los Angeles County Museum of Art, Los Angeles, CA
- LUMA Foundation, Zurich, CH
- Museum of Modern Art, New York, NY
- Museo Nacional Centro de Arte Reina Sofia, Madrid, ES
- The National Library of Australia Film Collection, Parkes (Canberra), AU
- The Pennsylvania State University, State College, PA
- Thoma Foundation, Santa Fe, NM
- Walker Art Center, Minneapolis, MN
- Whitney Museum of American Art, New York, NY
- Zabludowicz Collection, London, UK
- ZKM, Center for Art and Media, Karlsruhe, DE

== See also ==
- Cutout animation
- Computer animation
