= Devon Turnbull =

Founder of Ojas

Devon Turnbull (born 1979, Smithtown, NY) also known as Ojas, is an artist, audiophile, and the founder and operator of the audio-component manufacturing business, Ojas.

== Early life and education ==
Turnbull was born in New York, relocating to a transcendental meditation center in Fairfield, Iowa, with his family at age 11. In 8th grade, Turnbull began collecting records. Turnbull began DJing at a young age which introduced him to hip-hop and dance music. Turnbull dropped out of high school, received his GED and moved to Washington at the age of 17 to study at The Art Institute of Seattle. When Turnbull moved to Seattle, he began DJing under the name "Ojas". In Seattle at the Art Institute, Turnbull studied audio engineering. Turnbull additionally studied graphic design.

== Career ==
Turnbull moved back to New York in 1999. When he moved back, Turnbull began making stickers, T-shirts, and hats printed with Ojas—a Sanskrit term that loosely meaning to “life vitality”. Turnbull previously used Ojas as his tag as a graffiti writer. In 2003, Turnbull cofounded a menswear label Nom de Guerre with Isa Saalabi, Wil Whitney, and Holly Harnsongkram. In addition to being a menswear label, Nom de Guerre ran a subterranean shop and cultural hub in downtown Manhattan. Turnbull's work with Nom De Guerre brought him to Japan often where he was heavily influenced by the Japanese vintage hi-fi scene. Nom de Guerre ceased production in 2010.

In October 2024, Klipsch Audio Technologies announced a partnership with Turnbull. The partnership will involve Klipsch producing a limited number of loudspeakers that will be handcrafted in Hope, Arkansas.

=== Installations ===
In the mid-2000s, Turnbull designed the sound system in the lobby of the Ace Hotel New York. The installation at the Ace Hotel was a pivot-point in Turnbull's career, opening his eyes to the potential of evolving his long-standing passion for hi-fi audio into a viable commercial pursuit.

Ojas speakers are installed in 14 Supreme stores worldwide. The Brooklyn club Public Records had Turnbull design an audiophile-grade system for their space in Gowanus, Brooklyn.

Turnbull was friends with Virgil Abloh. Abloh tapped Turnbull to make custom speakers for Abloh's “Figures of Speech” exhibition, which opened at the Museum of Contemporary Art Chicago in 2019.

=== Exhibitions ===
==== HiFi Dream Listening Room No. 1 - 2022 ====
In 2021, Turnbull's friend, Hugh Hayden, introduced him to Alex Logsdail, an audiophile and CEO of Lisson Gallery, where Hayden exhibits. Logsdail invited Turnbull to place an Ojas system inside of the gallery as part of a show called “The Odds Are Good, the Goods Are Odd,” a group show with a focus on handmade sculpture. The work, titled HiFi Dream Listening Room No. 1— was located in a 390-square-foot room at the back of the gallery.

==== Ojas Listening Room at USM Modular Furniture - 2023 ====
In 2023, USM Modular Furniture commissioned Turnbull to install a listening room at their New York City store.

==== HiFi Dream Listening Room No. 2 - 2024 ====
HiFi Pursuit Listening Room Dream No. 2 was part of the Art of Noise exhibition at SF MoMA.
