= Pixia =

Graphic editing software

- Pixia 6.03c running on Windows 10.
- Original authors: Isao Maruoka, Tacmi Co.
- Developer: Isao Maruoka
- Release: 1998; 28 years ago
- Stable release: 6.62b (32-bit); 6.61p (64-bit) / October 8, 2024; 20 months ago (32-bit); March 12, 2024; 2 years ago (64-bit)
- Operating system: Microsoft Windows (Windows 2000 / XP / Vista / 7); older versions support Windows 95 / 98 / ME / NT 4.0
- Available in: Multilingual (10)
- Type: Raster graphics editor
- License: Freeware
- Website: www.pixia.jp

Pixia is a freeware raster graphics editor program for Windows, created by Isao Maruoka (丸岡 勇夫, Maruoka Isao). It was originally designed for the anime/manga community but has also been used in other branches of art. A successor to ART/fw, a full-color graphics tool developed for Windows 3.1, ver. 0 was released in the fall of 1998 and celebrated its 15th anniversary in 2013. The program is still being upgraded at a high frequency.

In addition to Pixia, other versions were developed under the names A/PIXIA and Phierha to enhance functions, but they were never officially released. After reviewing those versions, Pixia ver. 5 was released in 2009. Ver. 5 also features significant changes in interface design, among others.

Although ver.4 continues to be supported for users who prefer the conventional interface, the focus of development has shifted to ver.6, resulting in the existence of two series of Pixia.

== Overview and features ==
Despite being freeware, the program boasts advanced features such as layer functionality, mask planes, transparency planes, and transparent color planes (requires filters). It supports external plugins, enabling functional expansions like adding data import/export formats and integration with other software. Filters and plugins are created and released by volunteers on numerous websites. A module allowing Adobe Photoshop plugins to be used in Pixia was also developed by users. Since December 2004, it has supported the PSD format, making collaboration with other software like Photoshop easier.

From the 2000s through the early 2010s, Pixia was the only free graphics software with such advanced capabilities. Consequently, it was adopted as bundled software for tablets, including those from Wacom. Paid OEM versions with added material data were also produced and sold in packages. Paid filters and support were also sold via download. Numerous instructional books were published, positioning it as the primary choice for beginners in digital drawing.

Due to its development predating the expiration of the GIF patent in June 2004, it long lacked native GIF file support by default. However, GIF files became standard functionality starting with the ver.4 series released after the patent expired.

There were also multiple language versions for the program, including Japanese, English, French, German, Spanish, Hungarian, Italian, Polish, Chinese (simplified and traditional), and Korean, but only the Japanese and English versions have been released since ver. 4.

== Reception ==
A CNET Editors' Review in January 2011 called Pixia "one of the most capable and professional Photoshop alternatives we've tried."

== See also ==
- Comparison of raster graphics editors
- Clip Studio Paint
- Krita
- PaintTool SAI
