= PaintTool SAI =

Image editor and digital painting software

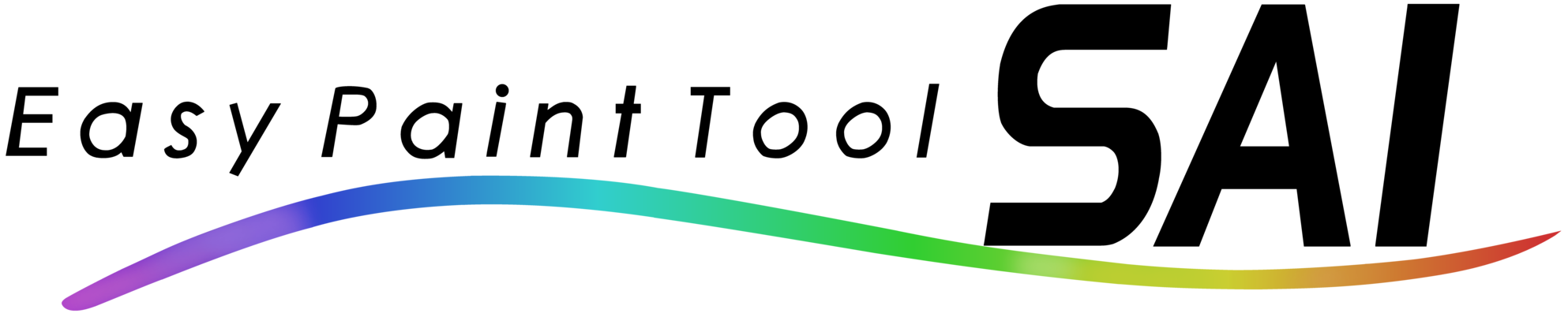

- PaintTool SAI 1.1.0 running on Windows 7
- Other names: SYSTEMAX Advanced Illustrator
- Developer: Koji Komatsu
- Release: 1.0.0 / February 25, 2008; 18 years ago
- Stable release: 1.2.5 / April 25, 2016; 10 years ago
- Preview release: Beta 3 / September 25, 2026; 15 days ago
- Written in: C++
- Operating system: Microsoft Windows
- Size: 2.9 MB
- Available in: Japanese, Spanish, German
- Type: Raster graphics editor
- License: Shareware (31-day trial)
- Website: systemax.jp/en/sai/

PaintTool SAI or Easy Paint Tool SAI (ペイントツールSAI) is a lightweight raster graphics editor and painting software for Microsoft Windows developed by Koji Komatsu (小松 浩司, Komatsu Kōji) and published by Systemax. The prototype of the software was "Full Color Paint Tool -Sai-" (フルカラーペイントツール-彩-, Furukarā peinto tsūru -Sai-) for X68000, produced in October 1996; Development of the software began on August 2, 2004, with an alpha version released on October 13, 2006, a beta version on December 21, 2007, and a commercial version (1.0.0) on February 25, 2008. It has been available on Microsoft Windows from XP to 11. A version 2 is in development as of 2026.

== Features ==
SAI is a lightweight painting application. The user interface allows multiple documents to be opened at the same time. The drawing canvas can be both zoomed and rotated using the sliders on the navigator or the hotkeys configured on the keyboard. The toolbar on the top part of the screen also includes a button to mirror the drawing view without mirroring the actual drawing. It is also possible to open multiple viewports to the same document. An application-wide scratchpad (which can be used as a color mixing panel) is provided, which is saved between sessions. Colors can be stored in the swatches panel.

Various raster drawing tools are implemented, such as the Airbrush, Watercolor, Pen, and Marker, which can all be customized, and stored in slots in the user interface of the application. There is also a set of vector drawing tools intended for inking, which, like the raster tools, can be configured to be pen pressure-sensitive.

Work can be done on separate layers, which can be grouped and have opacity masks. In addition to this, layers can be masked by clipping them to a lower layer. This allows one to add shading and highlights to an area without creating new masks for the additional layers.

There is also a pen movement and pressure smoothing feature which can be manually configured as to how much effect it has.

Selection tools include the simple square selection, the lasso, and magic wand, which can be configured for anti-aliasing. There is also a selection brush tool, which can be customized like the drawing brush.

SAI comes with a full set of transformation tools that can work on selections, including move, resize, rotate, and a free (perspective) transform. Any series of transforms can be set up and then applied at once to a specific selection minimizing the softening of the image.

Unlike other tools, SAI is not multipurpose, and has few functions to assist editing, such as graphic drawing tools, text input tools, and special effect filters (these will be implemented in version 2). SAI displays white and transparency in the same way, which may cause significant display differences when exporting to another program, such as Adobe Photoshop. There is also no printing functionality, but documents can be exported in a range of popular formats, such as .PSD or .BMP files, in addition to the native .SAI format.

Because the program does not focus on image editing, the only adjustments present are Brightness/Contrast and Hue/Saturation, and therefore offer no support of level editing, channel extraction, etc. Users may use another program for more complex editing, but when the image is brought back to SAI, its properties may be changed.

SAI also includes linework layers, which can be used instead of manually drawing linework. The linework layer includes different tools designed specifically for creating line art, such as the Line, Curve, Edit, Pressure, and Weight tool.

== Customization ==
Various settings and features can be accessed and edited by the user either from the built-in Options dialog, or using the provided misc.ini file in the installation folder which allows additional options and customization. Existing brush presets can be edited, and the user has the choice of adding custom ones by placing bitmap files into the "elemap" folder. New canvas presets, as well as custom brush textures may be added by the user, in the form of grayscale bitmaps.

== Version 2 ==
In parallel with the updates to SAI, development began on version 2, in which the software is being rebuilt from the ground up. It is commonly known as SAI2. A preview version was released on December 10, 2013, and an English preview version was released on January 2, 2015.

Later, when the cost of adding features to version 1 reached its limit, the policy was changed to cancel all planned additions to version 1 and implement them in version 2. Although a paid upgrade was originally planned, this change made the upgrade from version 1 to version 2 free of charge. Users who purchased version 1 can also use version 2 at no additional cost.

As of 2026, a Major Renovation Version had been released for Version 2 Beta 3, adding several features from other painting programs, such as a lasso fill tool, a native Dark Mode, a Greyscale Colour mode, and Colour Management. It also improves upon existing features, notably the Text Tool.

== Reception ==
In 2016, PaintTool SAI listed as the most used painting software on Pixiv, followed with Adobe Photoshop and Clip Studio Paint.

According on official poll on DeviantArt conducted in 2013, PaintTool SAI is the second most used painting software with 36507 votes, after Photoshop.

Due to its popularity, Krita provides introduction for PaintTool SAI users that want to move to the software.

== See also ==
- Clip Studio Paint
- Adobe Photoshop
- Corel Painter
- Krita
- Pixia
