= Paul Wilbur Klipsch =

American engineer (1904–2002)

- Born: March 9, 1904; Elkhart, Indiana
- Died: May 5, 2002 (aged 98); Hope, Arkansas
- Occupations: Engineer, inventor, entrepreneur, lieutenant colonel, geophysicist, pilot, founder of Klipsch & Associates.
- Employer(s): Klipsch Audio Technologies; Klipsch & Associates; US Army; Subterrex; Independent Exploration Co. Chilean Nitrate Mining Co. General Electric

Paul Wilbur Klipsch (March 9, 1904 – May 5, 2002) was an American engineer and high fidelity audio pioneer, known for developing a high-efficiency folded horn loudspeaker. Unsatisfied with the sound quality of phonographs and early speaker systems, Klipsch used scientific principles to develop a corner horn speaker that sounded more lifelike than its predecessors.

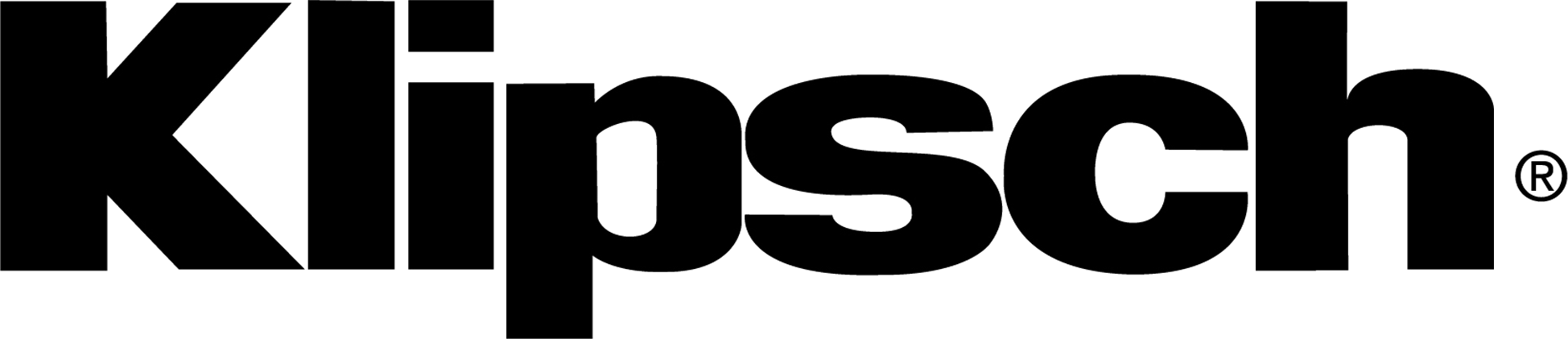
Klipsch Audio Technologies

The Klipschorn, which today is still manufactured and sold worldwide, proved popular. The resulting acoustics career of Klipsch spanned from 1946, when he founded one of the first U.S. loudspeaker companies, to 2000 when the Journal of the Audio Engineering Society published one of his papers. He died on May 5, 2002, at the age of 98.

Fred Klipsch, former Klipsch owner and chairman and cousin to founder Paul Wilbur Klipsch, said, "Paul was a verifiable genius who could have chosen any number of vocations, but the world sounds a lot better because he chose audio."

== Early life and education ==
Klipsch's interest in engineering was influenced by his father, an instructor of mechanical engineering at Purdue University in West Lafayette, Indiana. Although he was only 12 when his father died, Klipsch's interest in science and engineering endured. He built his first speaker using a mailing tube and a pair of earphones at the age of 15, which was a year before the first public radio broadcast.

After graduating from El Paso High School, he enrolled at New Mexico State University (NMSU) where he played cornet in the university band and was an award-winning member of the school rifle team. He credits his four years as a member of the Aggie Band for developing his love and knowledge of music and musical instruments. Klipsch received a Bachelor of Science in electrical engineering from New Mexico State University in 1926, and an EE (Engineer's degree) in electrical engineering from Stanford University in 1934.

== Career ==
Following graduation from NMSU, Klipsch went to work for General Electric designing radios that were then sold to RCA. In 1928, he responded to a notice on the GE bulletin board. This resulted in a new job maintaining electric locomotives in Chile for three years before entering graduate school at Stanford. After receiving his EE Degree, Klipsch worked as a geophysicist for a Texas oil company. He later served in the U.S. Army during World War II, earning the rank of lieutenant colonel.

It was during his service at the Southwest Proving Grounds in Hope, Arkansas, that Klipsch refined his corner horn speaker design. Visitors to his officer's quarters were amazed by the lifelike reproduction and encouraged Klipsch to start his own manufacturing business. He received a patent on his loudspeaker design in 1945, registered the name Klipsch & Associates in 1946, and made each loudspeaker himself until he hired his first employee in 1948.

During a videotaped interview in 1999, Klipsch claimed that he did not, in fact, name the Klipschorn himself. He said that he made a sales call to a man in New York City during the first years of operating Klipsch & Associates and, surprisingly, the business prospect already knew about the revolutionary new loudspeaker. "We've heard all about your corner horn," the man said. "We call it the Klipschorn."

== Legacy ==
In 1978, Paul W. Klipsch was awarded the Audio Engineering Society's second highest honor, the silver medal, for his contributions to speaker design and distortion measurement. In 1997, he was inducted into the Engineering and Science Hall of Fame. In 2004, at the International Consumer Electronics Show (CES), he was inducted into the Consumer Electronics Hall of Fame.

== New Mexico State University ==
Klipsch received an honorary LL.D. from New Mexico State University (NMSU) in 1981. The College of Electrical and Computer Engineering was renamed the Klipsch School of Electrical and Computer Engineering in his honor in 1995. The Paul W. and Valerie S. Klipsch Museum was established and dedicated October 1997.

=== Eccentricities ===
Klipsch related that when he was developing a smaller speaker for use between two Klipschorns, an acquaintance declared that he couldn't possibly introduce it to the public because it was in direct violation of Klipsch's own corner horn principles, and amounted to acoustic heresy. "The hell I can't," Klipsch said. "And that's exactly what I'm going to call it!"

While the official company motto is "The Ultimate Sound Experience," the unofficial one is "Bullshit." Klipsch started using the slogan after reading a competitor's loudspeaker ad that made claims of supposed "breakthroughs." After that, he wore a yellow "Bullshit" button behind his lapel and showed it to anyone he felt was making an outlandish claim.

Klipsch produced an irregular newsletter entitled "Dope from Hope" (Hope, Arkansas was where his company was based). A complete collection of these newsletters was republished in 2023 via an oversubscribed Kickstarter.

== Patents ==
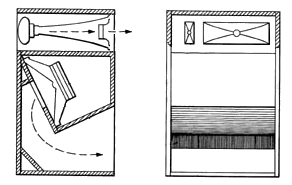
Small dimension low frequency folded exponential horn loudspeaker with unitary sound path and loudspeaker system including same. US patent 4138594. (1979)

- Stock-and-barrel assembly for firearms. US patent 2205982. Klipsch, P.W., 6/25/1940.
- Wave synthesizing network. US patent 2230803. Klipsch, P.W., 2/4/1941.
- Electrical prospecting with alternating current. US patent 2231013. Klipsch, P.W., 2/11/1941.
- Recording seismic waves. US patent 2232612. Klipsch, P.W., 2/18/1941.
- Seismic prospecting. US patent 2232613. Klipsch, P.W., 2/18/1941.
- Equalizer. US patent 2238023. Klipsch, P.W., 4/8/1941.
- Electrical prospecting. US patent 2243428. Klipsch, P.W., 4/27/1941.
- Mixing circuit for electrical prospecting. US patent 2251549. Klipsch, P.W., 8/5/1941.
- Method of electrical prospecting. US patent 2293024. Klipsch, P.W., 8/11/1942.
- Firearm vibration control. US patent 2302699. Klipsch, P.W., 11/14/1942.
- Horn for loud-speaker. US patent 2310243. Klipsch, P.W., 2/9/1943.
- Loudspeaker. US patent 2373692. Klipsch, P.W., 4/17/1945.
- Rotating band tester. US patent 2450003. Klipsch, P.W., 9/28/1948.
- Loud-speaker horn. US patent 2537141. Klipsch, P.W., 1/9/1951.
- Crossover filter network. US patent 2612558. Klipsch, P.W., 9/30/1952.
- Loudspeaker (Rebel). US patent 2731101. Klipsch, P.W., 9/30/1952.
- Logarithmic converter circuit. US patent 3330966. Klipsch, P.W., 7/11/1967.
- Small dimension low frequency folded exponential horn loudspeaker with unitary sound path and loudspeaker system including same. US patent 4138594. Klipsch, P.W., 2/6/1979.
- Low frequency folded exponential horn loudspeaker apparatus with bifurcated sound path. US patent 4210223. Gillum, G. C./ Klipsch, P.W., 7/1/1980.
- Crossover network for optimizing efficiency and improving response of loudspeaker system. US patent 4237340. Klipsch, P.W., 12/2/1980.
- Anechoic chamber arrangement. US patent 4387786. Klipsch, P.W/Hunter, J. R., 6/14/1983.
