= XP-PEN =

Graphics tablet brand

XP-Pen
- Industry: Graphics tablet
- Founded: April 8, 2005; 21 years ago
- Founder: P-Active
- Headquarters: Shenzhen, China
- Products: Deco, Star, Artist, Innovator, Magic Drawing Pad
- Parent: Hanvon Ugee Group
- Website: www.xp-pen.com

XPPen (formerly stylized XP-Pen) is a brand of graphics tablets, pen displays and digital styluses. The brand was established in 2005 and is part of the Shenzhen-based Hanvon Ugee group.

The company's products are sold under several lines, including the Artist pen-display range and the Deco and Star pen-tablet ranges. In Japan, XPPen had an 8.4% share of the pen-tablet market in 2025, second to Wacom.

== Product lines ==
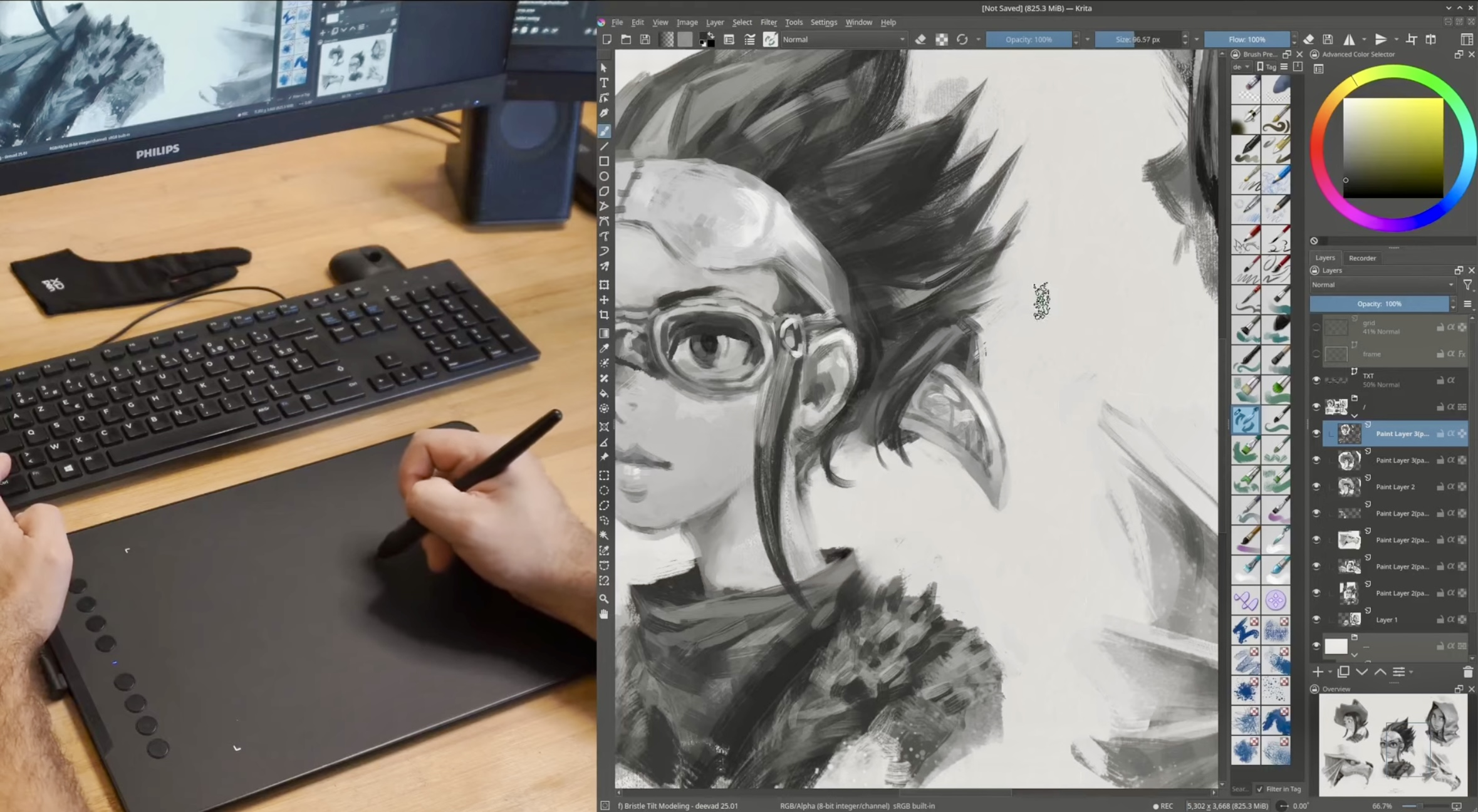
XP-PEN Deco 01V3 utilizing Krita software

XPPen products include variously sized graphics tablets that may or may not include an integrated drawing display. The company's product lineup is segmented into several series based on form factor, target user groups, and application scenarios. These include the Magic series, which features all-in-one drawing displays; the Artist Pro series and Artist series, which focus on drawing displays; and the Deco Pro series and Deco series, which primarily consist of drawing tablets. Additionally, XPPen offers other classic products, such as the Star series, as well as various accessories.

The Deco Fun line, introduced in 2021, serves as an affordable range of drawing tablets comparable to the Wacom Intuos series historically produced through the Deco and Star product lines.

=== Artist series display ===
Product name	Year	Physical dimensions (mm)	Drawing area (mm)	Pen pressure levels	Resolution (px)
Artist 22HD	2015	517 x 321 x 30	476.64 x 268.11	2048	
Artist 10S	2016	301 x 209 x 5	217 x 136	2048	
Artist 16	2016	405 x 255 x 33	344.16 x 193.59	2048	
Artist 13.3	2017	390 x 250 x 14	293 x 165	8192	1920 x 1080
Artist 15.6	2017	443 x 280 x 12.6	344.16 x 193.59	8192	1920 x 1080
Artist 22E	2017	567 x 326 x 30	476.64 x 268.11	8192	1920 x 1080
Artist 12	2018	369.11 x 218.87 x 11.5	263.23 x 148.07	8192	1920 x 1080
Artist 22 (2nd Generation)	2021	538 x 332 x 25.8	476.06 x 267.79	8192	1920 x 1080
Artist 24	2021	590 x 361 x 34	526.85 × 296.35	8192	2560 x 1440
Artist 10 (2nd Gen)	2022	299 x 173.3 x 12.9	224.49 x 126.7	8192	1920 x 1080
Artist 12 (2nd Gen)	2022	346.2 x 209 x 12	263.23 x 148.07	8192	1920 x 1080
Artist 13 (2nd Gen)	2022	378 x 225 x 12	293.76x165.24	8192	1920 x 1080
Artist 16 (2nd Gen)	2022	434 x 255.8 x 12.89	340.99 x 191.81	8192	1920 x 1080
Artist 24 FHD	2023	590 x 361 x 34	526.85 × 296.35	8192	1920 x 1080
Artist 22 Plus	2023	547 x 364.67 x 33.4	476.06 x 267.79	16384	1920 x 1080
Artist 12 3rd	2025	327 x 189.1 x 12.0	264 x 149	16384	1920 x 1080
Artist 16 3rd	2026	407.9 x 232.8 x 12.8	342 x 193	16384	1920 x 1080

=== Artist Pro series display ===
Product name	Year	Physical dimensions (mm)	Drawing area (mm)	Pen pressure levels	Resolution (px)
Artist 16 Pro	2018	405 x 255 x 30	344.16 x 193.59	8192	1920 x 1080
Artist 22 Pro	2018	517 x 321 x 30	476.64 x 268.11	8192	1920 x 1080
Artist 22E Pro	2018	567 x 326 x 30	476.64 x 268.11	8192	1920 x 1080
Artist 12 Pro	2019	351.52 x 225.38 x 12.9	256.32 x 144.18	8192	1920 x 1080
Artist 13.3 Pro	2019	390 x 250 x 14	293 x 165	8192	1920 x 1080
Artist 15.6 Pro	2019	443 x 280 x 12.6	344.16 x 193.59	8192	1920 x 1080
Artist 22R Pro	2020	570 x 334.8 x 44.8	476.06 x 267.79	8192	1920 x 1080
Artist 24 Pro	2020	632 x 370 x 44.8	526.85 x 296.35	8192	2560 x 1440
Artist Pro 16 (2021)	2021	443.27 x 256.45 x 9	340.99 x 191.81	8192	1920 x 1080
Artist Pro 16TP	2021	406.4 x 263.1 x 15.4	345.6 x 194.4	8192	3840 x 2160
Artist Pro 14 (Gen2)	2023	359.30 x 268.57 x 19.31	298.94 X 186.84	16384	1920 x 1200
Artist Pro 16 (Gen2)	2023	405.11 x 291.37 x 20.23	344.68 x 215.42	16384	2560 x 1600
Artist Pro 19 (Gen2)	2024	460 x 306.6 x 21.5	409 x 230	16384	3840 x 2160
Artist Pro 24 (Gen 2) 165Hz	2024	638 x 408 x 44	526 x 296	16384	2560 x 1440
Artist Pro 24 (Gen 2) 4K	2024	638 x 408 x 44	526 x 296	16384	3840 x 2160
Artist 13.3 Pro V2	2024	390.4 x 249.98 x 12.9	294.76 x 166.24	16384	1920 x 1080
Artist 15.6 Pro V2	2024	442.91 x 279.91 x 12.9	340.99 x 191.81	16384	1920 x 1080
Artist Pro 22 (Gen 2)	2025	547 x 362 x 33.4	475.39 x 267.40	16384	2560 x 1440
Artist Pro 27 (Gen 2)	2026	681.3 x 423.8 x 44.0	596.7 x 335.7	16384	3840 x 2160

=== Innovator series display ===
Product name	Year	Physical dimensions (mm)	Drawing area (mm)	Pen pressure levels	Resolution
Innovator 16	2020	443.27 x 256.45 x 9	344.16 x 193.59	8192	5080 LPI

=== Deco ===
Product name	Year	Physical dimensions (mm)	Drawing area (mm)	Pen pressure levels	Resolution
Deco mini7 V2	2024	260.2 × 162.2 × 9.3	177.8 × 111.1	16384	5080 LPI
Deco 01 V3	2024	351 × 217 × 8	254 × 158.75	16384	5080 LPI
Deco 640	2024	149.96 × 188.34 × 7.7	160 × 90	16384	5080 LPI

=== Deco Pro ===
Product name	Year	Physical dimensions (mm)	Drawing area (mm)	Pen pressure levels	Resolution
Deco Pro MW (Gen 2)	2023	283 x 227.1 x 10.66	228.6 x 152.4	16384	5080 LPI
Deco Pro LW (Gen 2)	2023	333 x 258.1 x 10.66	279.4 x 177.8	16384	5080 LPI
Deco Pro XLW (Gen 2)	2023	435 x 313.1 x 10.66	381 x 228.6	16384	5080 LPI

=== Magic Drawing Pad ===
Product name	Year	Physical dimensions (mm)	Drawing area (mm)	Pen pressure sensitivity	Resolution	Ref.
Magic Drawing Pad	2024	279 x 192 x 6.9	171.94 x 257.9	16384	2540 LPI	

=== Magic Note Pad ===
Product name	Year	Physical dimensions (mm)	Drawing area (mm)	Pen pressure sensitivity	Resolution
Magic Note Pad	2025	182 x 259 x 7	148 x 236	16384	5080 LPI

== Drivers ==
XPPen supplies drivers for Windows 7, 8, 10 and 11; OS X 10.8 and above; and CentOS, Linux Mint, and Ubuntu. Most of XPPen's products have a driver for Windows and Mac, with specific drivers provided for the supported Linux distributions (see the table below).

Supported Product
Artist Display 12/15.6/13.3
Deco 01/01V2/02/03Wireless/mini04/06Wireless/mini07/mini07Wireless
Star 03/04/05/06/G430/G540/G640/G430S
Star03 Pro/G540 Pro/06C
