= Klipsch Audio Technologies =

American audio equipment manufacturer

Klipsch, LLC
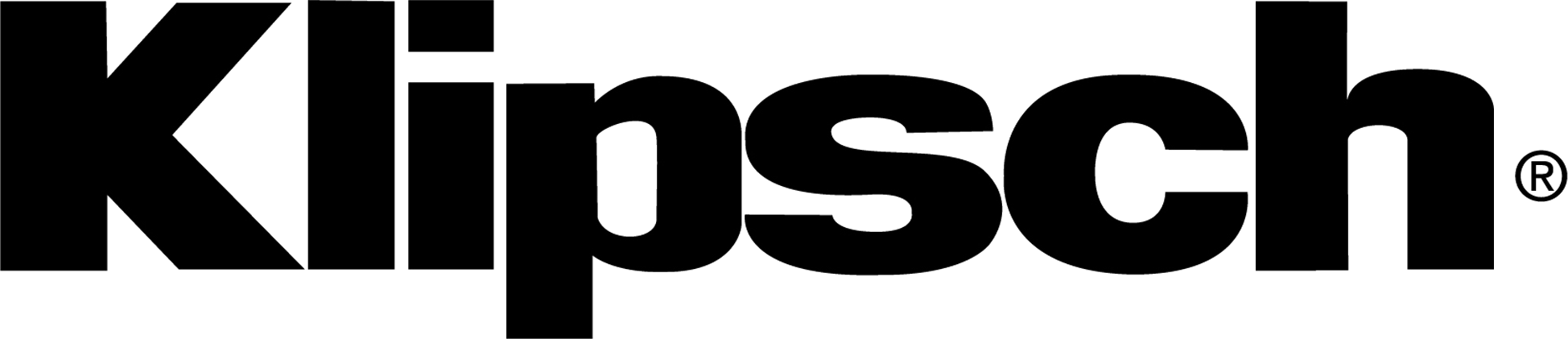
- Type: Subsidiary of Voxx International
- Industry: Audio
- Founded: 1946; 80 years ago (as Klipsch and Associates)
- Founder: Paul W. Klipsch
- Headquarters: Indianapolis, Indiana, U.S.
- Key people: Paul Jacobs (President)
- Products: Loudspeakers, headphones
- Parent: Voxx International
- Website: www.klipsch.com

Klipsch Audio Technologies /ˈklɪpʃ/ (also referred to as Klipsch Speakers or Klipsch Group, Inc.) is an American loudspeaker company based in Indianapolis, Indiana. Founded in Hope, Arkansas, in 1946 as 'Klipsch and Associates' by Paul W. Klipsch, the company produces loudspeaker drivers and enclosures, as well as complete loudspeakers for high-end, high-fidelity sound systems, public address applications, and personal computers.

On January 6, 2011, Audiovox announced that the company had signed a "term sheet to purchase all the shares of Klipsch Group Inc". The sale was completed March 1, 2011.

== Horn loading ==
Since its inception, Klipsch has promoted the use of horn-loaded speakers as part of its goal to produce speakers featuring:

- High efficiency (more formally called "sensitivity"), meaning that they can be driven by relatively low-powered amplifiers
- Low modulation distortion, which Paul Klipsch believed was very important
- Wide dynamic range, meaning that they accurately reproduce both soft and loud sounds
- Controlled directivity, meaning that the radiation pattern is directional, rather than diffuse
- Flat frequency response, meaning that there is no unnatural emphasis in the bass, mid-range or treble.

The company advocates the superiority of horns for the aforementioned properties, but historically horns have a reputation for a coloring of the sound sometimes described as "honkiness". The exact causes of this coloration are still being researched, but one cause is vibration of the horn material itself. Early Klipsch designs utilized metal-throated horns whose material could be energized by the sound within, creating a "ring" or "buzz." Klipsch subsequently introduced horns of braced fiberglass which were said to alleviate resonances that colored the earlier, metal designs. Other causes of "honkiness" are acoustic resonances and reflections when the horn shape causes poor transitions in the acoustic wave expanding from the horn driver. In addition to the direct acoustic effects, these resonances and reflections transform into peaks and dips in the electrical impedance, making problems for the passive crossover network. In 1989, Klipsch introduced a midrange horn with a tractrix flare which was said to reduce "honkiness" and create a more open sound quality, compared to earlier designs. Klipsch also moved away from silk diaphragms to different driver-diaphragm materials like phenolic resin aluminum and titanium, to inject a purer sound into the horn in the first place. Midrange horns made entirely of formed wood were used into the 1950s.

Historically, Klipsch speakers were designed based on principles originating at Bell Labs in the 1930s. Objectives included wide soundstage and frequency range from about 30 Hz to 15 kHz, and the speakers were designed to be placed in a room with no single dimension a multiple of another. For competitors who disregarded this old research, Klipsch made a special "Bullshit" button (inspired by his extensive usage of the word), that he pinned inside his jacket lapel. When someone he was listening to made bogus claims he flashed the button and walked off.

== Products ==
=== The Klipschorn ===
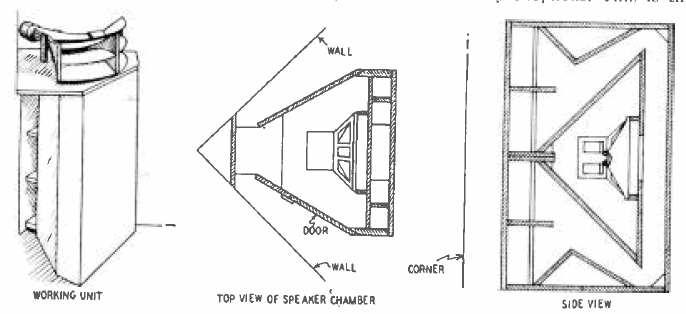
Klipschorn speaker system

The Klipschorn, or K-Horn, loudspeaker is the flagship product of Klipsch Audio Technologies. It was patented by founder Paul W. Klipsch in 1946 and has been in continuous production in the company's Hope, Arkansas, plant since then—the longest run in speaker production history. Although the Klipschorn's basic design is more than seventy years old, it has received periodic minor modifications. A "knockoff" (Model K) was offered for years in kit form through Seattle kit manufacturer SpeakerLab.

The Klipschorn's large (51” H (129 cm) x 31” W (79 cm) x 28” D (72 cm)) enclosure houses a three-way design: separate drivers—the woofer, the squawker, and the tweeter, respectively—handle the bass, midrange, and treble portions of the sound signal.

Two rectangular horn lenses coupled to compression drivers handle the midrange and treble, while a 15” cone woofer is mounted in a folded bass bin compartment below. The folds open at the rear of the horn cabinet structure, utilizing the room walls and floor as continuations of horn structure, thereby increasing the effective length and size of the horn, thus lowering its cut-off frequency and, likewise, its lowest usable tone.

The body of the speaker cabinet forms a horn. The “K-Horn” shape is like a baseball diamond: the pointy rear is open and exposed, the flat front covered with a wood panel and the top enclosed in cloth. The speaker sits in the corner of two adjoining walls, using the walls and floor boundaries as extensions of the horn. Technically speaking, the K-Horn's folded bass "corner horn" can be described as a bifurcated trihedral (floor and two walls to form the trihedral corner) exponential wave transmission line.

This design results in extremely high efficiency. One watt RMS produces a 105 decibel at 1 meter sound pressure level (SPL), which is approximately 14–20 decibels higher than conventional speakers. Such sensitivity requires less amplifier power to achieve the same loudness. (Paul Klipsch demonstrated that the Klipschorn could reproduce concert-level dynamics powered by as little as 1 watt per channel.) The K-Horn encourages the use of low-powered amplifiers. The growing popularity in the audiophile community of single-ended valve (vacuum tube) amplifiers has sparked renewed interest in the Klipschorn and other highly sensitive Klipsch models.

Utilizing the room walls and floor boundaries as extensions of the bass horn helps extend the speaker's frequency response down into the 35 Hz range, considerably lower than would be possible otherwise. Because of the folded horn, the woofer cone moves no more than a few millimeters.

As the only speaker in the world to be in continuous production for 70 years, the Klipschorn has remained relatively unchanged since its inception. Circa 1970, diode overload protection was added across voice coils to prevent burnout from clipping produced by an overdriven amplifier. The midrange horn was originally made entirely from formed wood. Some fibreglass bells were used on the midrange horn, as well as metal, in the late 1950s. Eventually the midrange horn was changed from metal to braced fiberglass, and the tweeter was front mounted in the 1980s. Both of these changes reduced the already low distortion. In 2005, the company made some minor cosmetic and functional revisions to this legendary speaker, including the elimination of the inset collar, or spacer, between the upper and lower cabinets for a cleaner appearance. A horizontal wall seal was added to improve the low frequency horn's connection to the wall. The crossover, which includes some equalization, was revoiced in the early 2000s.

In 2006, Klipsch offered the 60th Anniversary Klipschorn, a separate model from the standard Klipschorn.

In 2016, Klipsch released the 70th Anniversary Klipschorn with a fully enclosed horn. The release was limited to 70 pairs.

=== Other legacy speakers ===
Among Klipsch's legacy models, the La Scala and the Klipsch Belle, are fully horn-loaded and have extremely high sensitivity similar to the Klipschorn, but their W-shaped folded bass horns do not require corner placement in the listening room. The La Scala II, which uses the same drivers as the Klipschorn but has a smaller bass chamber and less bass extension, was voted into Stereophile magazine's "Recommended Components" in the "A" class for speakers with restricted extreme low frequency. Other models, including the Cornwall and Heresy, use horn tweeters and midranges in conjunction with direct-radiating woofers and also have unusually high sensitivity (although not as high as the fully horn-loaded models).

All of the models cited above feature separate horn-loaded tweeter and midrange. As of 2006, the majority of current Klipsch models are two-way designs, utilizing a tractrix horn for the upper midrange and treble.

Wood finishes available were Macassar ebony, zebrawood, rosewood, teak, cherry, oak oil, oak lacquer, walnut oil, walnut lacquer, raw birch, birch lacquer, and finished black. Many dealerships displayed wood samples to let customers view and custom-order the veneers. The Klipsch factory would then specifically match the woodgrain on the tops and sides so pairs of speakers would be identical to each other. In a letter sent to its dealers around 1990, Klipsch cited concern over the responsible use of exotic woods from the rainforests and as a result retired the ebony, zebrawood, rosewood and teak veneers.

=== Current speakers ===
The Palladium line, introduced in 2007, is a line of premium speakers. These are sold through special qualified dealers only.

The three Icon Series lines (X, W, and V) are diverse products designed to satisfy a variety of tastes and budgets. X=Modern Technology, Contemporary Beauty; W=Modern Technology, Classic Beauty; V=Modern Technology, Value Driven Performance. The trademark of all three is the use of the new 90-degree by 90-degree XT Tractrix horn.

The Synergy line is sold by major mass-market retailers.

The Reference line tends to be carried by audio specialty stores and custom installers. One feature of the Reference line is the use of the trademark Cerametallic woofers. These are a combination of materials that produce a very stiff, highly controlled cone movement.

The newer (2015) Reference Premier series continues improvements with their Hybrid Tractrix Horn, Linear Travel Suspension (LTS) Titanium Tweeter, Spun Copper Cerametallic Woofers, and an all new Tractrix Port for the cleanest, most powerful low-frequency response on the market.

THX Ultra II series is a line of dedicated theater speakers and subwoofer.

The Klipschorn, La Scala II, Cornwall IV, Forte IV, and Heresy IV comprise the Heritage line, which is available through select authorized Klipsch dealers and Klipsch direct, often by special order.

In October 2024, Klipsch Audio Technologies announced a partnership with Devon Turnbull.

==== Multi-media speakers ====
The company also manufactures products for multimedia purposes; its ProMedia line of computer speakers has been sold since 1999, and it produces iPod-marketed speakers like the iGroove (with an angled form-factor).

==== Klipsch used in theaters ====
Klipsch also features its speaker designs in the Hard Rock Cafe line of restaurants and in several AMC and Regal theaters. Krikorian Theatres have digital sound featuring the Klipsch KMX sound system.

Theaters such as Hollywood's BM Theater house are using Klipsch theater systems for the 18000 audience capacity movie house. On a smaller scale, cinemas like Golden Village (Singapore) used Klipsch custom speakers for their GV Grand and IMAX theaters.

=== Headphones ===
"In Ear" headphones or earphones using balanced armature technology were launched in November 2007. These headphones use patented Contour Ear Gels, invented by Mark Blanchard of Klipsch Group, which are anatomically designed to accurately fit inside the human ear canal. These oval shaped silicone tips reduce ear fatigue by minimizing pressure to any one area of the ear canal wall. The patented ear tips are designed to be inserted in the ear canal to acquire an air seal for noise isolation and a proper frequency response.

In addition to several in-ear Image models, Klipsch launched its first on-ear model, the Image ONE, in 2010.

== Group subsidiaries and acquisitions ==
Klipsch Group, Inc., the parent company of Klipsch Audio Technologies, also owns the Danish loudspeaker firm Jamo, and in 2006 acquired the brands of Mirage, Athena and Energy from Audio Products International (API) of Canada. In 2001 it acquired the company Mondial Designs, manufacturers of electronics under the Aragon and Acurus brand names, but subsequently discontinued those product lines. In 2009, electronic engineers Ted Moore and Rick Santiago left Klipsch and founded Indy Audio Labs. They purchased the Aragon and Acurus component designs and brands from Klipsch. Both Aragon and Acurus components today are designed and manufactured in Indiana.

=== Energy ===
Energy is a Canadian manufacturer of loudspeakers founded in 1973. They produce the Take, Connoisseur and Veritas product lines. The Energy Take Classic 5.1 HTIB system was named a CNET Editor's Choice in 2011. In 2013, Klipsch sued online retailer Monoprice for patent infringement, claiming that Monoprice's 5.1 Hi-Fi system was identical to the Take Classic, which was later settled out of court.

=== Jamo ===
Jamo (yah-mo) is a Danish manufacturer of loudspeakers. The company was founded in 1968 by Preben Jacobsen and his brother-in-law, Julius Mortensen. The company name is derived from the founders' surnames. At one point, Jamo employed more than 400 workers at its factory in Glyngøre and in 1994 it was Europe's largest speaker manufacturer.

In 1998, the company had produced and sold more than 11.5 million units. In 2002, businessman Anders Høiris was hired as director to reverse declining sales. His efforts proved unsuccessful; a major company backer, FSN Capital, then transferred its interest in the brand to Jyske Bank. Høiris then resigned. Company production has, since 2004, been located in China. Jamo was taken over in 2005 by Klipsch Audio Technologies, which Høiris had arranged for before his departure.

== Sponsorship ==
In 2019, McLaren Racing announced a multi-year partnership beginning from the 2020 Formula One season, where Klipsch would provide all of McLaren's team headsets.
