= HUION =

China-based graphics tablet brand

- Industry: Graphics tablet
- Founded: 2011; 15 years ago
- Founder: Henry Xu
- Headquarters: Shenzhen
- Area served: Worldwide
- Products: Digital ink devices
- Owner: Huion Trend
- Website: www.huion.com

HUION (Chinese: 绘王) is a Chinese pen tablet display brand founded in 2011 by Henry Xu. It is owned by Huion Trend (short for Shenzhen Huion Trend Technology Co., Ltd., formerly known as Huion Animation). It mainly manufactures drawing tablets and pen displays. It also produces digital notebooks. The brand's tablet devices are usually economical, and it developed a stylus technology called PenTech. In addition, it also owns and operates the HuionTablet app.

HUION specializes in the production of drawing tablets. Its tablet products are suitable for beginners, as well as professionals. The Kamvas and Inspiroy series are the representative products of the brand. Headquartered in Shenzhen, its products are also available in overseas markets such as the US, Singapore, and Indonesia.

HUION is seen as a competitor to Wacom, and they respectively occupy the mid-range and higher-end markets of graphics tablet. In July 2021, the brand released the Kamvas Pro 24. As of November 2022, it had more than 10 million users.

== Compatibility ==
Most HUION products have official drivers only for Windows and MacOS, however newer lineups such as the Kamvas and the Kamvas Pro graphics tablets also include official Linux drivers.

== History ==
HUION entered the graphics tablet industry in 2011. In 2014, its first light pad product was introduced. In 2017, the brand entered the Bangladeshi market. In 2019, it made a foray into Japan. In the same year, the Kamvas Pro 22 became available.

In 2021, HUION launched the Kamvas 16. In July 2022, its owner's name was changed from Huion Animation to Huion Trend. In January 2023, the brand rolled out the Kamvas Studio 16 and Kamvas Studio 24.

In January 2024, HUION attended CES in Las Vegas, where it showcased the Kamvas Pro 27 and Kamvas Pro 19 display tablets. The two products were initially launched in China on December 15, 2023.

From April to December 2025, HUION sequentially released the Kamvas Slate 11 & 13, the third-generation edition of the Kamvas Pro 24, as well as the Kamvas Pro 27 (144Hz) pen display. In March 2026, it introduced the Kamvas 22 (Gen 3).
