= Clip Studio Paint =

Digital illustration software

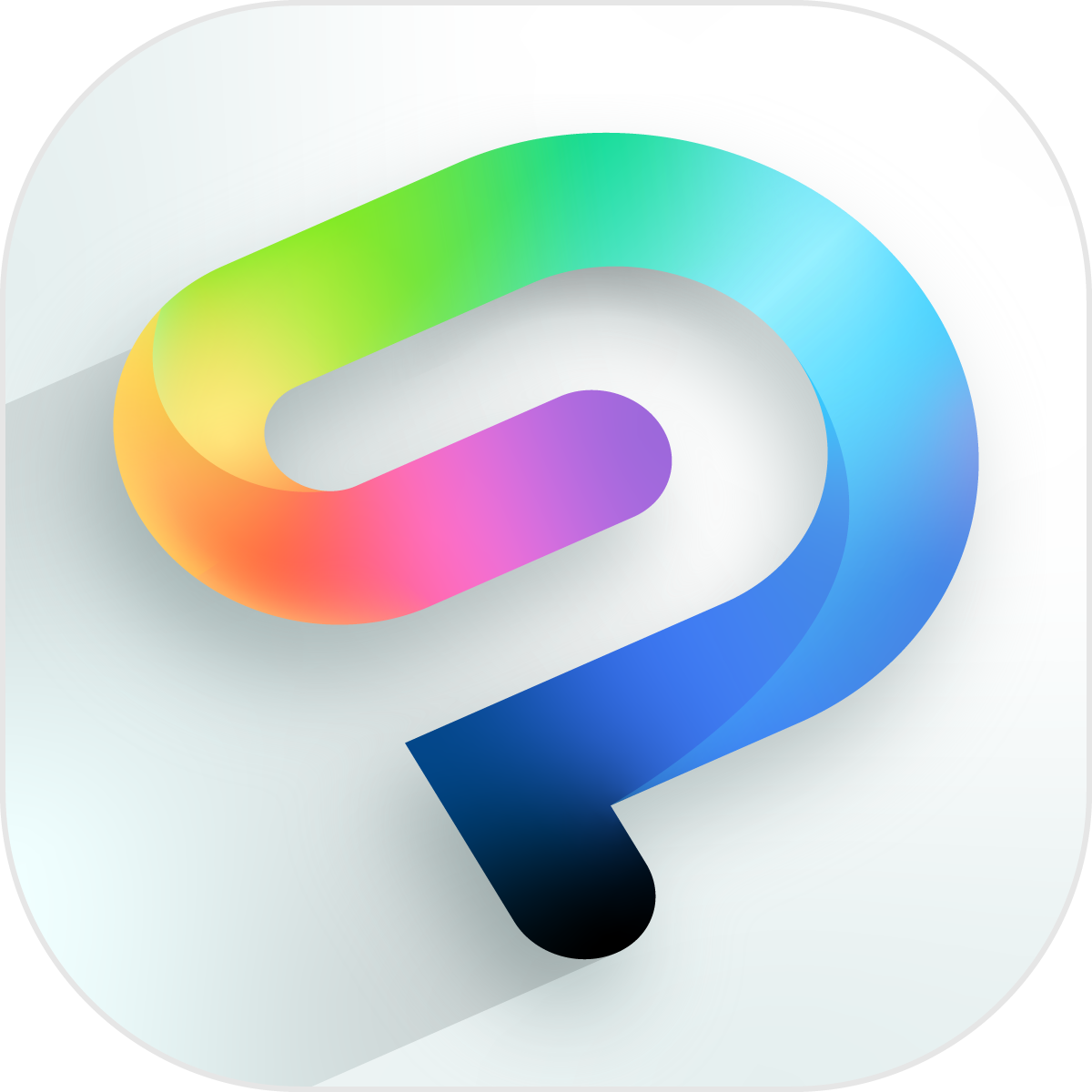
- Developer: Celsys
- Release: 2012; 14 years ago
- Stable release: 5.0.2 / March 30, 2026; 5 months ago
- Written in: C++, Python
- Operating system: macOS, Windows, iPadOS, iOS, Android, ChromeOS
- Available in: 10 languages
- List of languages English (United States), French, German, Indonesian, Japanese, Korean, Portuguese (Brazil), Spanish, Thai, and Traditional Chinese
- Type: Graphics editor
- License: Proprietary
- Website: www.clipstudio.net/en

Clip Studio Paint (previously marketed as Manga Studio in North America), informally known in Japan as Kurisuta (クリスタ), (Note: A clipping of the Japanese pronunciation of its name, Kurippu Sutajio Peinto.) is a family of software applications developed by Japanese graphics software company Celsys. It is used for the digital creation of comics, general illustration, and 2D animation. The software is available in versions for macOS, Windows, iOS, iPadOS, Android, and ChromeOS. The program is widely used by amateur and professional comics creators, and animation studios.

The application is sold in editions with varying feature sets. The full-featured edition is a page-based, layered drawing program, with support for bitmap and vector art, text, imported 3D models, and frame-by-frame animation. It is designed for use with a stylus and a graphics tablet or tablet computer. It has drawing tools which emulate natural media such as pencils, ink pens, and brushes, as well as patterns and decorations. It is distinguished from similar programs by features designed for creating comics: tools for creating panel layouts, perspective rulers, sketching, inking, applying tones and textures, coloring, and creating word balloons and captions.

== History ==
The application has it origins in a program for macOS and Windows, released in Japan in 2001 as "Comic Studio". It was sold as "Manga Studio" in the Western market by E Frontier America until 2007, then by Smith Micro Software. Early versions were designed for creating black and white art with only spot color (a typical format for Japanese manga), with version 4 adding support for full-color art.

Celsys developed Clip Studio Paint as a replacement for this product, based on the company's Illust Studio application, and it was released on May 31, 2012. It was initially distributed in Western markets as "Manga Studio 5", but in 2016, the branding was unified worldwide as "Clip Studio Paint". At this time, version 1.5.4 introduced a new file format (extension .clip) and frame-by-frame animation. In late 2017, Celsys took over direct support for the software worldwide, and ceased its relationship with Smith Micro. In July 2018, Celsys began a partnership with Graphixly for distribution in North America, South America, and Europe.

Clip Studio Paint for the Apple iPad was introduced in November 2017, and for the iPhone in December 2019. Clip Studio Paint for Samsung Galaxy tablets and smartphones was released in August 2020 on the Galaxy Store, with versions for other Android devices and Chromebooks released in December.

The Windows and macOS versions of the software have been sold and distributed either from the developer's web site or on DVD, and purchased either with a perpetual license or an ongoing subscription. The versions for iPhone, iPad, and Android-based devices are distributed through the corresponding app stores free of charge, but require a subscription – which includes cloud storage – for unrestricted use. Without a subscription, the tablet versions can be used only for a specified number of months, and the phone versions can be used only for 30 hours per month.

From 2013 to 2023, updates for version 1 were distributed free of additional charge to both perpetual license holders and subscription users. In March 2023, Celsys changed its upgrade model and practices. At that time they released version 2, which – like all updates – was available to subscribers, but available to holders of perpetual licenses only at an additional cost: paying a one-time upgrade fee, or buying a 12-month "update pass" which provides access to updates like a subscription, but the license reverts to the original version if the pass is not renewed. As of 2026, similar "whole number" upgrades have been offered every 12 months, under similar terms.

== Editions ==
Clip Studio Paint is available in three editions, with differing feature sets and prices: Debut (bundle-only grade), Pro (adding support for vector-based drawing, custom textures, and comics-focused features), and EX (adding support for multi-page documents, book exporting, and 2D animation).

Companion programs include Clip Studio (for managing and sharing digital assets distributed through the Clip Studio web site, managing licenses, and getting updates and support) and Clip Studio Modeler (for setting up 3D materials to use in Clip Studio Paint).

== See also ==
- RETAS
- Adobe Photoshop
- Corel Painter
- Krita
- Paint Tool SAI
