= Krita =

Digital painting and 2D animation software

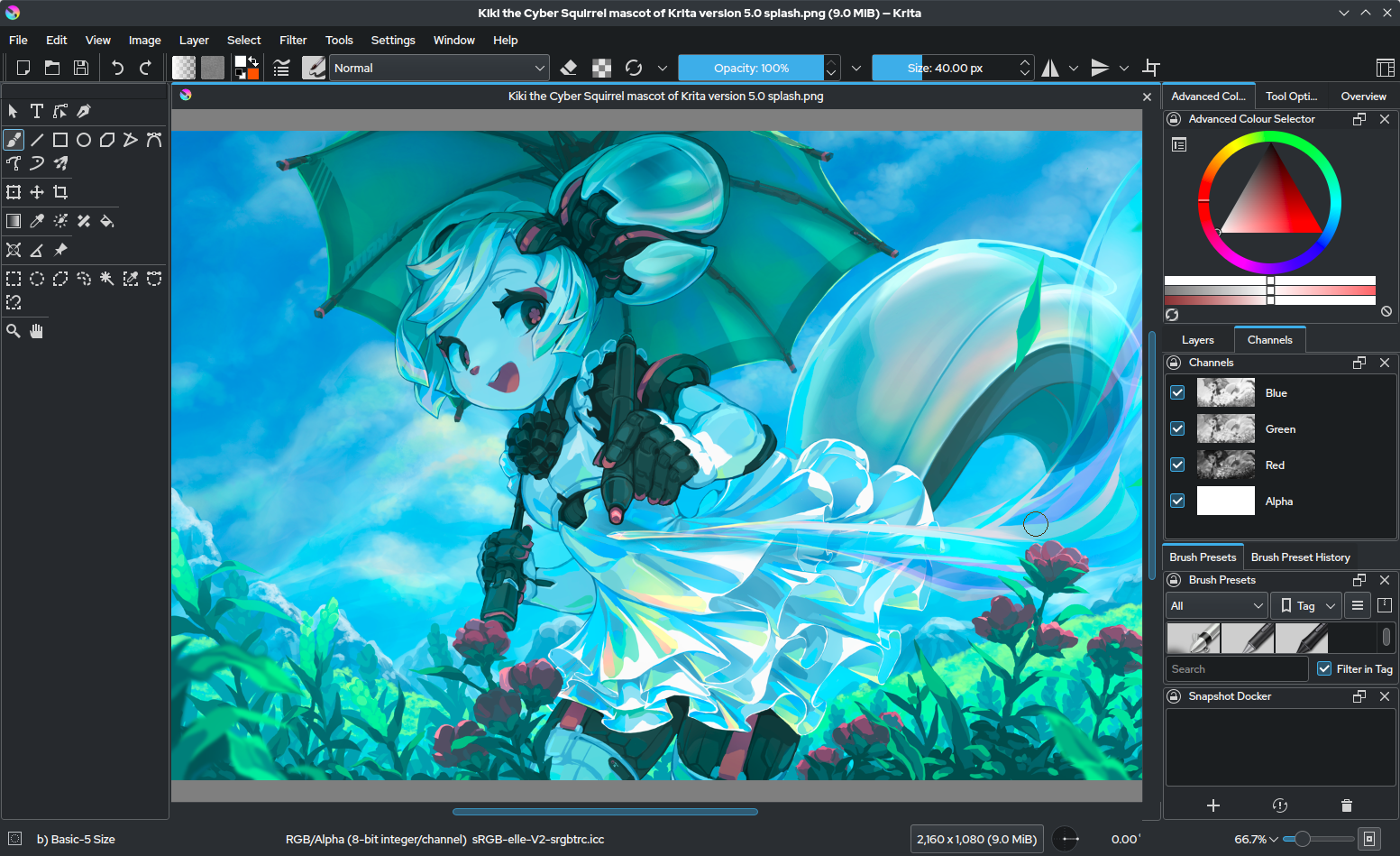
- Developers: Krita Foundation, KDE
- Release: 21 June 2005; 21 years ago
- Stable release: 5.3.2.1 / 2 June 2026
- Preview release: 6.1
- Written in: C++, Qt
- Operating system: Linux, macOS, Windows, Android, ChromeOS, Haiku
- Platform: IA-32 and x64
- Size: 111–201 MiB (varies by operating system)
- Type: Raster graphics editor
- Licence: GPL-3.0-only
- Website: krita.org
- Repository: invent.kde.org/graphics/krita

Krita (/ˈkriːtə/ KREE-tə) is a free and open-source raster graphics editor designed primarily for digital art and 2D animation.

Originally created for Linux, the software also runs on Windows, macOS, Haiku, Android, and ChromeOS, and features an OpenGL-accelerated canvas, colour management support, an advanced brush engine, non-destructive layers and masks, group-based layer management, vector artwork support, and switchable customisation profiles.

The software is also available as paid software, distributed on Microsoft Store, Steam, Epic Games Store, and Mac App Store. Payments support the development of the software. The paid version has automatic updates.

== Name ==
The project's name "Krita" is primarily inspired by the Swedish words krita, meaning "crayon" (or chalk), and rita which means "to draw" as well as Sanskrit कृत (kṛta) which means "made"/"done".

== History ==
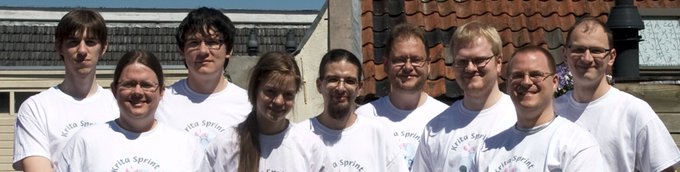
The Krita team in 2014

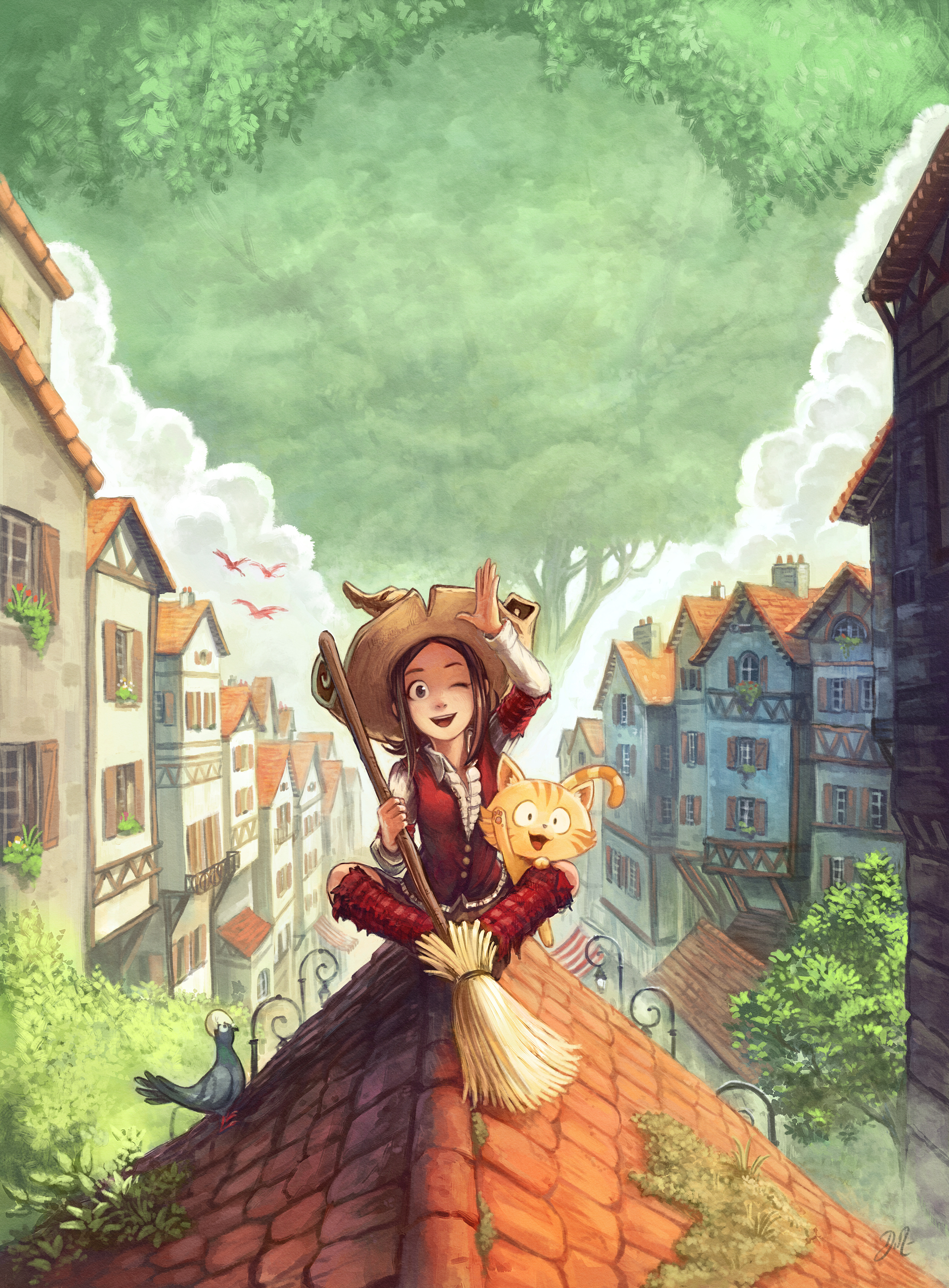
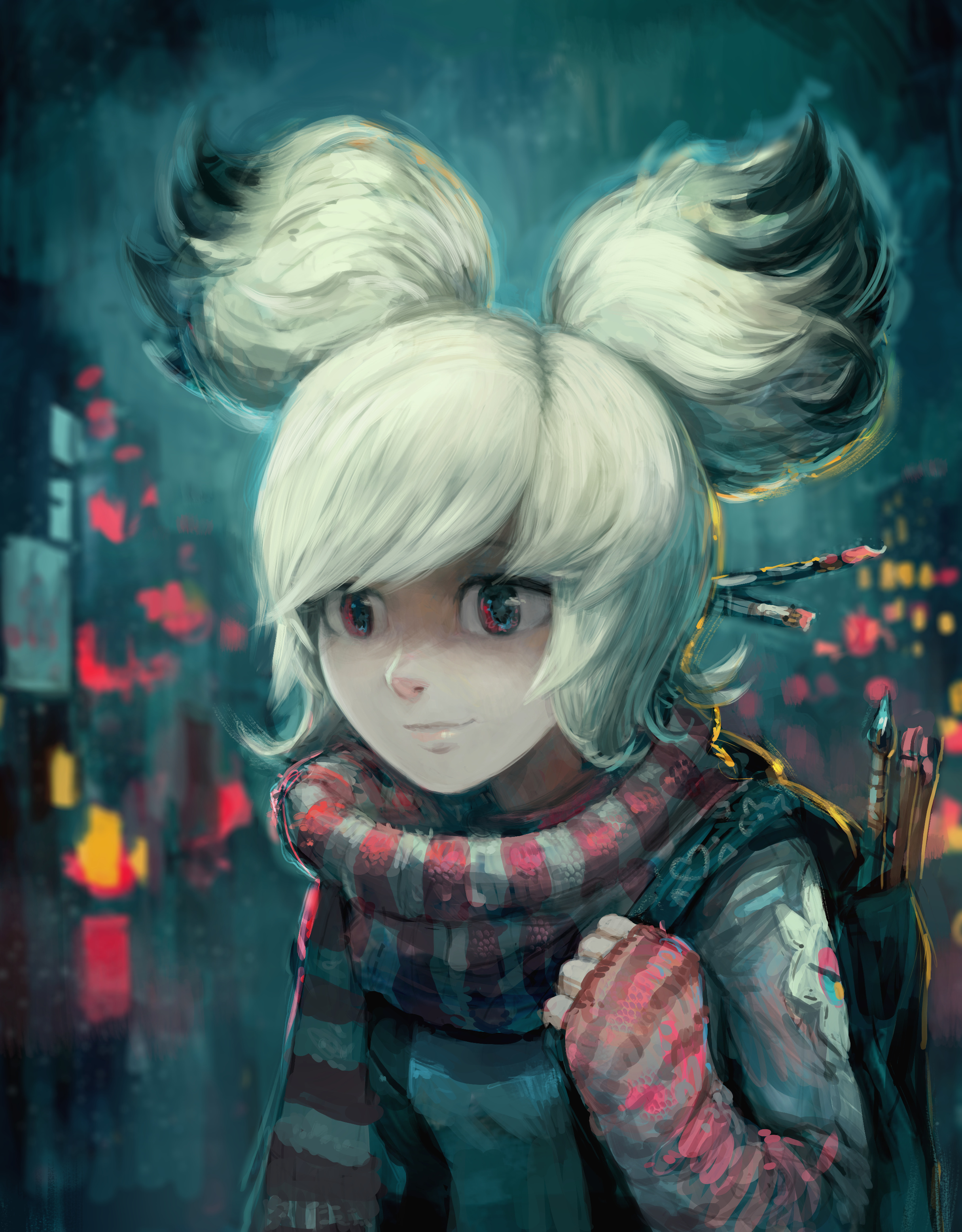
Free web comic Pepper&Carrot artwork by David Revoy (left) is drawn in Krita. In 2022, Revoy made an interpretation of Krita's mascot, Kiki (right).

Early development of the project can be tracked back to 1998 when Matthias Ettrich, founder of KDE, showcased a Qt GUI hack for GIMP at Linux Kongress. The idea of building a Qt-based image editor was later passed to KImage, maintained by Michael Koch, as a part of KOffice suite. In 1999, Matthias Elter proposed the idea of building the software using CORBA around ImageMagick. To avoid existing trademarks on the market, the project underwent numerous name changes: KImageShop, Krayon, until it was finally settled with "Krita" in 2002. The first public version of Krita was released with KOffice 1.4 in 2004. In years between 2004 and 2009, Krita was developed as a generic image manipulation software like Photoshop and GIMP.

A change of direction happened to the project in 2009, with a new goal of becoming digital painting software like Corel Painter and SAI. Also from that point, the project began to experiment with various ways of funding its development, including Google Summer of Code and funded jobs for students. As a result, the development gained speed and resulted in better performance and stability.

The Krita Foundation was created in 2013 to provide support for Krita's development. It collaborated with Intel to create Krita Sketch as a marketing campaign and Krita Studio with KO GmbH as a commercially supported version for movie and VFX studios. Kickstarter campaigns have been used to crowdfund Krita's development since 2014.

Time	Version	Raised	Kickstarter campaign	Stable release
July 2014	2.9.x	€19,955	Faster development, better PSD support, layers, masks, brush, resource manager, display, etc.	February 2015
May 2015	3.0.x	€30,520	Better performance, animation support, layer, workflow, transform, filter, brush, etc.	May 2016
May 2016	4.0.x	€38,579	Better text tools and vector art capability, python scripting support, etc.	March 2018
	5.0.X		Brushes, Gradients and Pallets get revamped, animation system improvements, screen recorder.	December 2021

On May 23, 2020, the beta version of Krita was released for Android and ChromeOS.

== Design and features ==
The current version of Krita is developed with Qt 5 and KDE Frameworks 5. It is designed primarily for concept artists, illustrators, matte and texture artists, and the VFX industry. It has the following key features:

=== User experience design ===
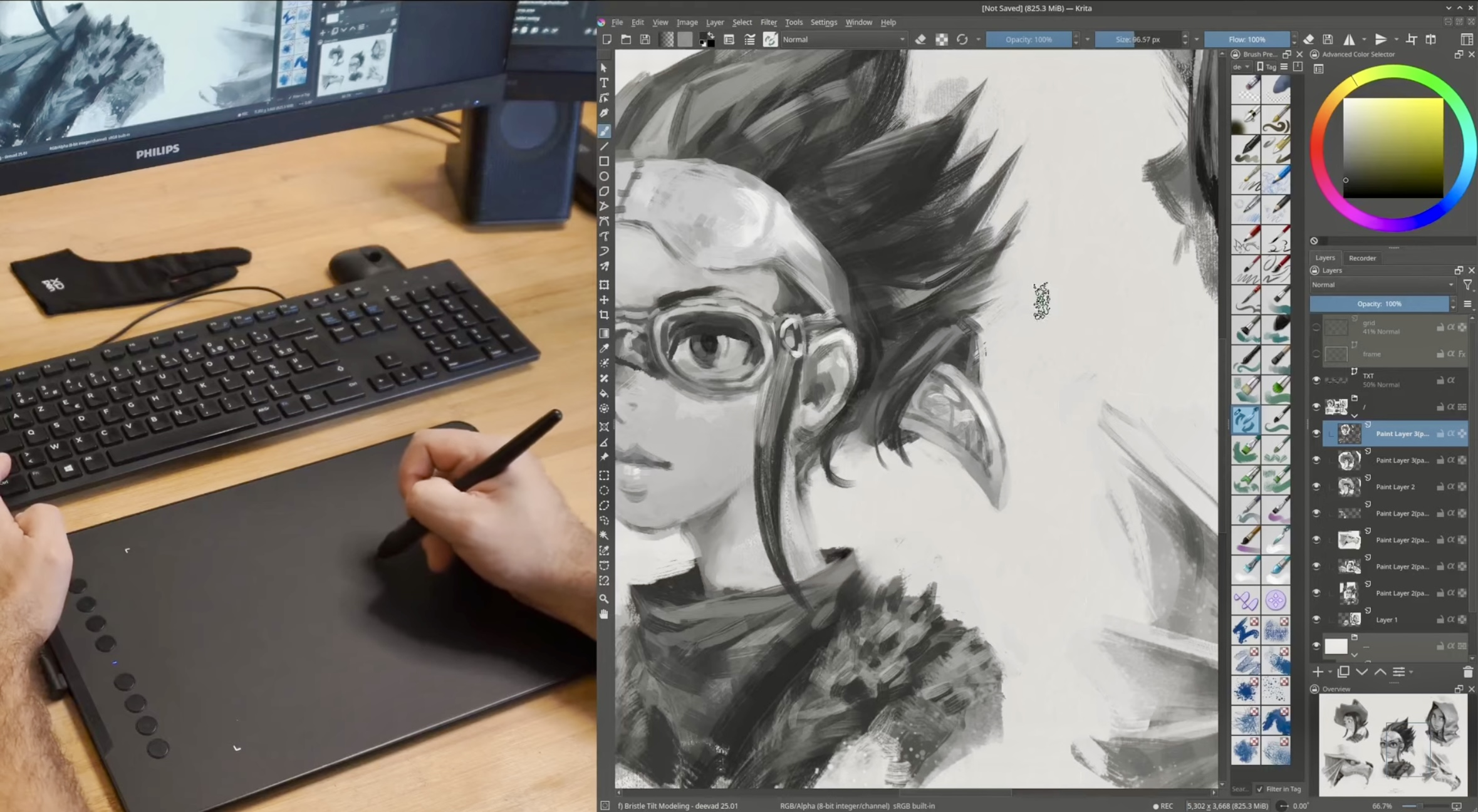
XP-PEN Deco 01V3 with Krita

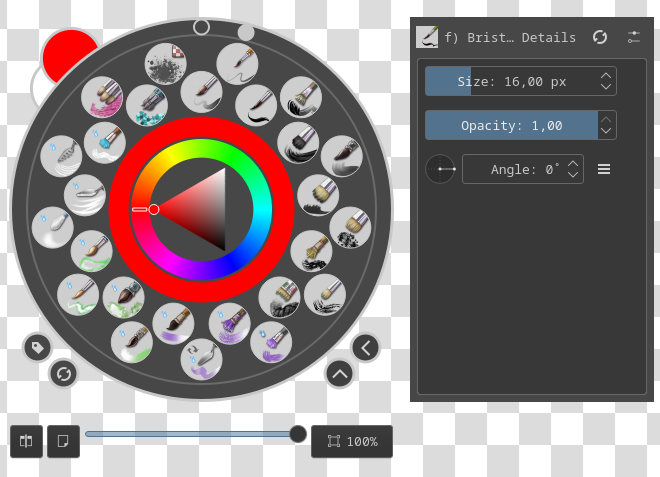
Krita's right-click HUD, the Popup-palette

Krita's UX was designed with graphics tablet users in mind. It uses a combination of pen buttons, keyboard modifiers and an icon-based HUD to ensure frequently-used functions can be accessed by fewer clicks, without the need to search through text-based menus.

Most-used drawing commands can be accessed via touch by combining keyboard modifiers with pen/mouse buttons and gestures:

Command	Input
Brush size ±	Shift + Pen drag
Pick colour	Ctrl + Pen tap
Pan	Pen button + Pen move
Zoom	Ctrl + Pen button + Pen move
Rotate	Shift + Pen button + Pen move

Pop-up Palette is Krita's right click HUD. It enables instant access to the following functions:

Brush	Colour	View
10 loaded brush presets	Colour ring selector	Zoom
Load other preset groups	FG/BG colour display	Rotate
Brush size, opacity, flow, spacing, angle	Recent colour	Mirror

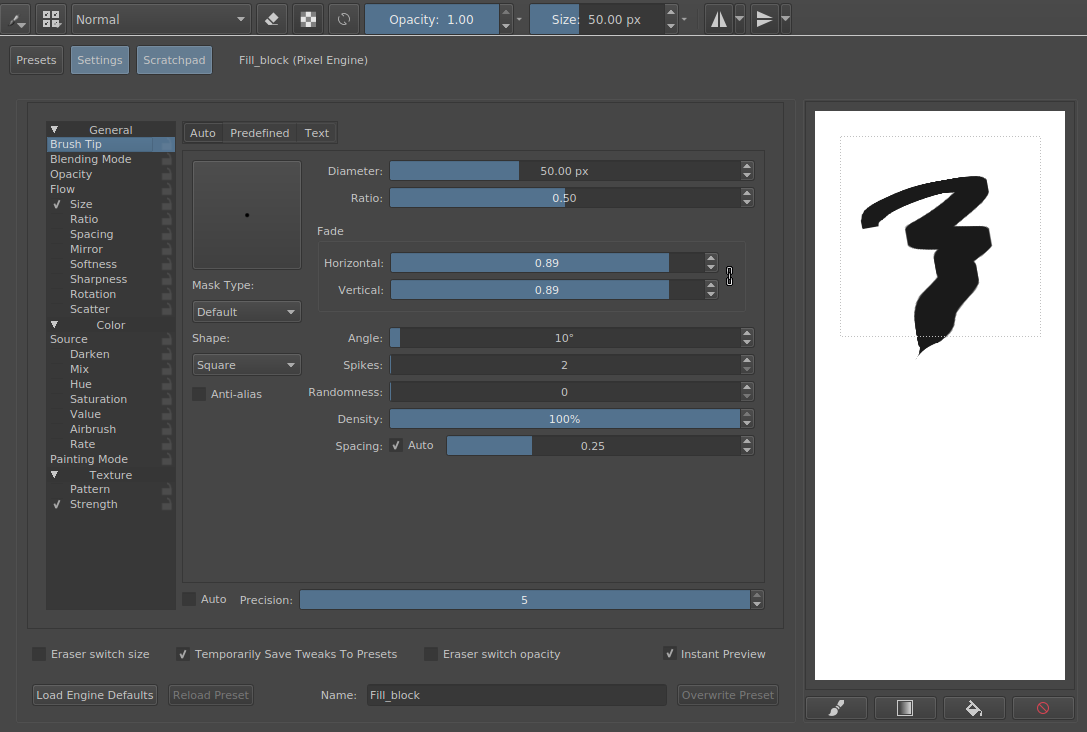
Controls of one of Krita's many brush engines

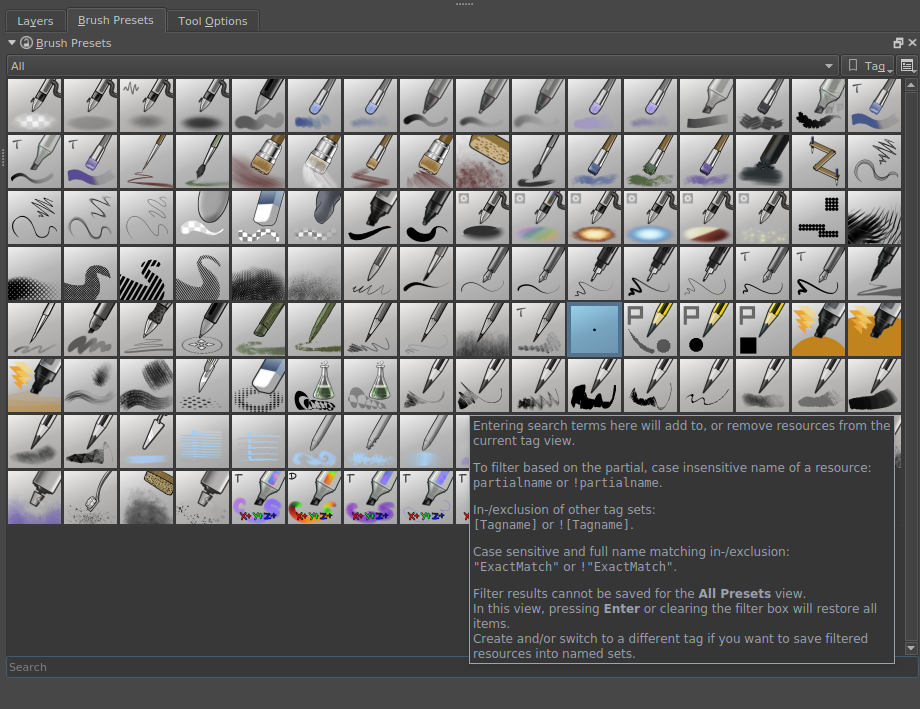
Krita's stock brushes

=== Painting tools ===
Krita's core digital painting tools include:

Brushes	Drawing assistants	Selection tools	Transformation tools
Graphics tablet support	Adjustable interference intensity	Rectangle	Free position
9 different brush engines	Infinite and parallel straight rulers	Ellipse	Rotate
Modelled after real tools	Splines (curves)	Freehand (lasso)	Scale
Highly adjustable	Ellipses	Polygon	Shear
Remembers settings for each physical pen	Perspective	Outline	Perspective
Pen stabilizer	Vanishing point	Fill	Warp
Multibrush painting support	Fish-eye point	Color	Cage

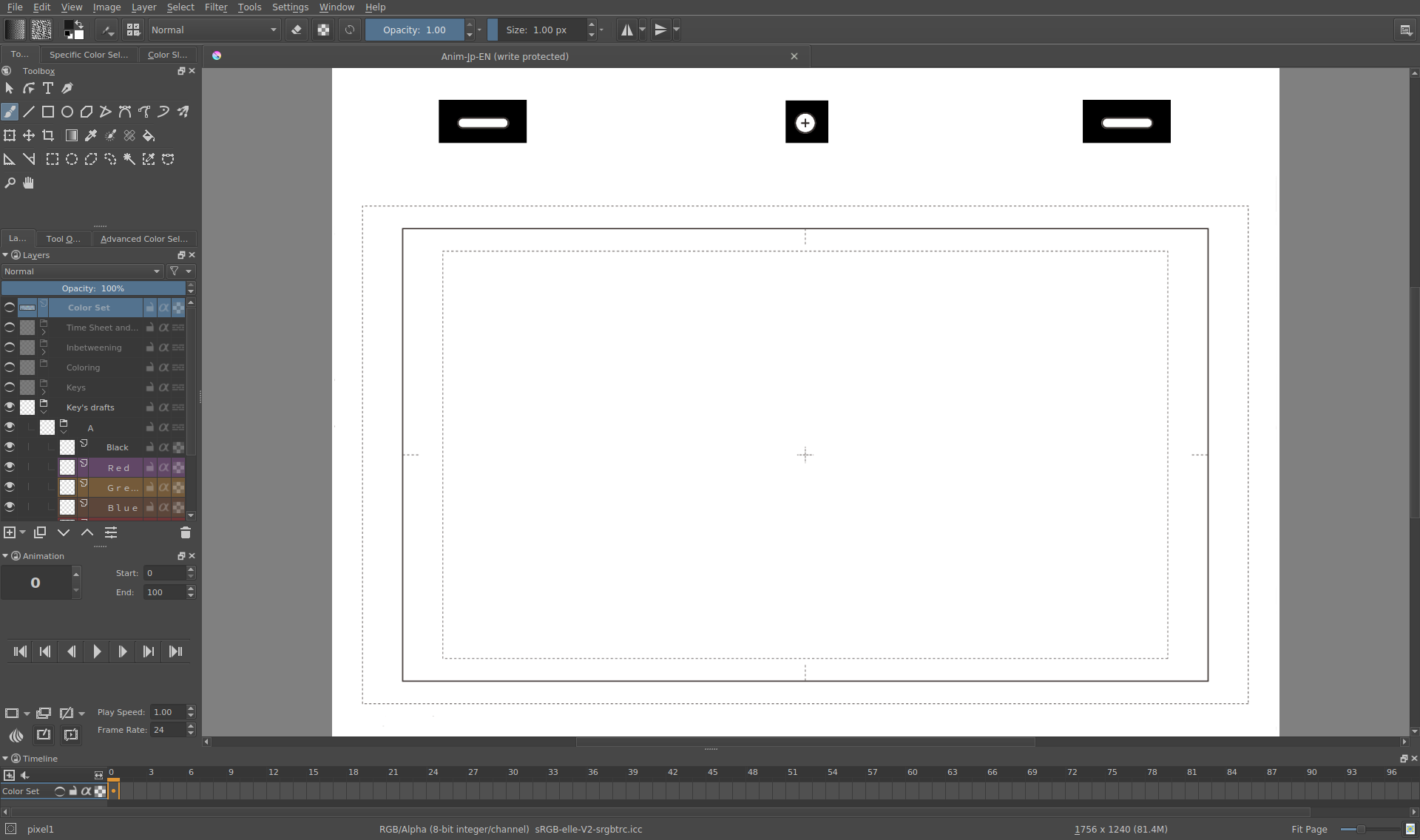
Krita's animation workspace (4.0 version)

=== Animation tools ===
Krita's animation tools are designed for frame-by-frame raster animation. They have the following features:

Interface	Import	Export
Similar interface to Adobe Animate	Batch import of frames	Render with FFmpeg
Timeline controls		Output to individual frames
Real-time animation playback controls		Output to GIF, AVI, MP4, etc.
Onion-skin display		

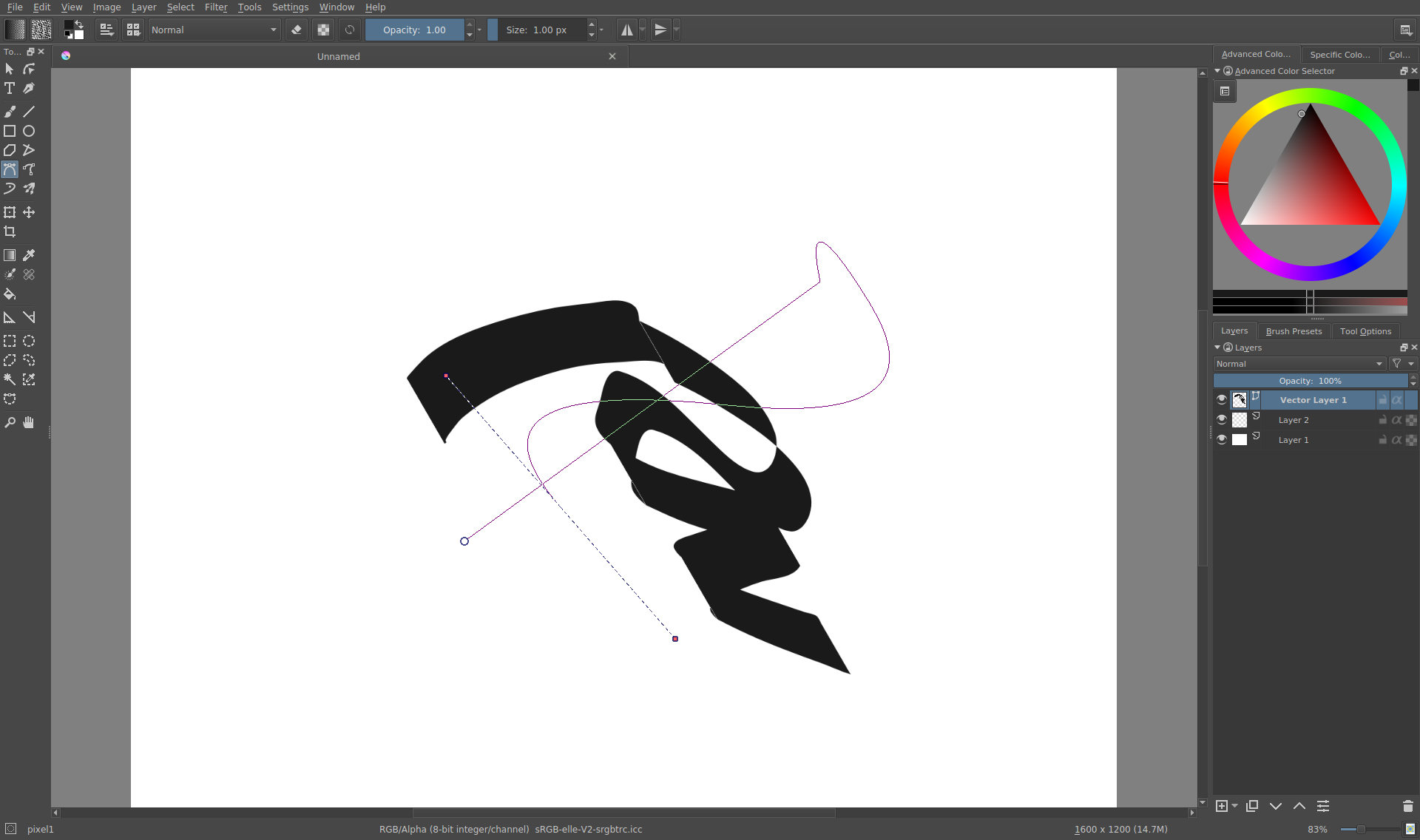
Krita's vector tools

=== Vector tools ===
Krita uses vector tools for non-destructive editing of the following objects:

- Path
- Selection
- Text (artistic, multiline, calligraphy)
- Vector art
- Fill and gradient

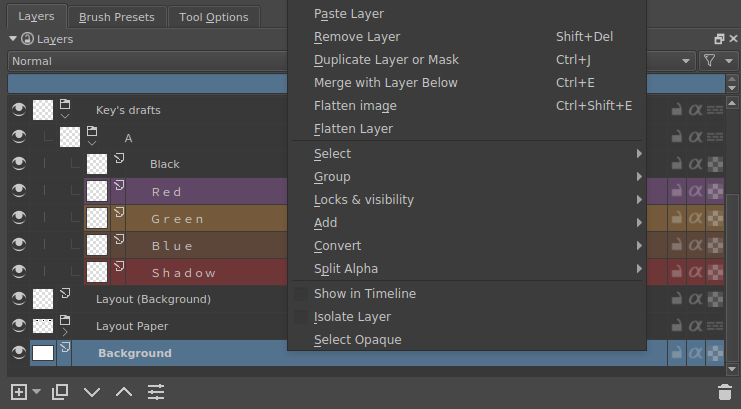
Krita's layer and mask controls

=== Layers and masks ===
Krita's layer and mask features include:

Layer management	Mask applies to	Non-destructive layers	Non-destructive masks
Multiple-level layer groups	Raster layers	Clone layers	Transparency masks
Select multiple layers	Vector layers	Filter layers	Filter masks
Drag-and-drop layers	Layer groups	Fill layers	Colourise masks
Layer highlighting	Non-destructive layers	File layers	Transform masks

=== Customisation ===
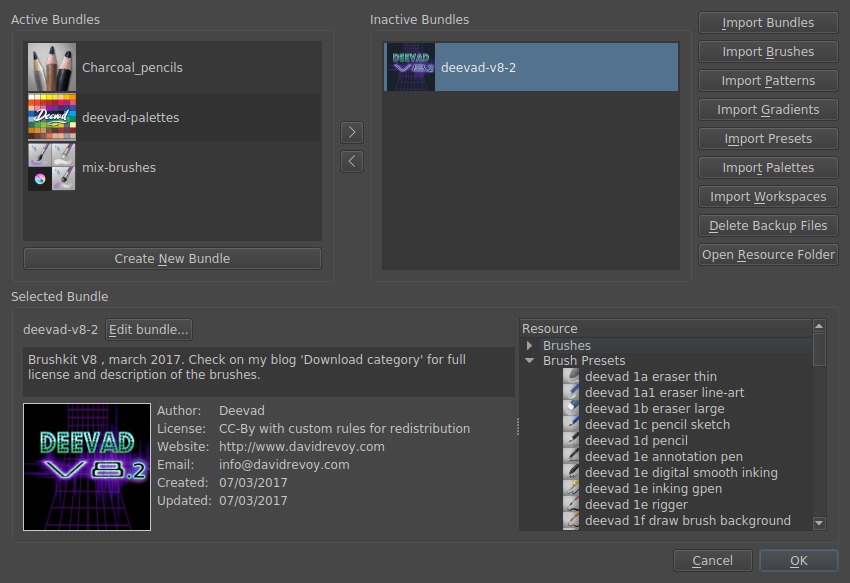
Krita's resource manager

Krita's resource manager allows each brush or texture preset to be tagged by a user and quickly searched, filtered and loaded as a group. A collection of user-made presets can be packaged as "bundles" and loaded as a whole. Krita provides many such brush set and texture bundles on its official website.

Customisable tool panels are known as Dockers in Krita. Actions include:

- 2 customisable toolbars
- Toggle display of each docker
- Attach any docker to any sides of main window, or detach to float free
- Buttons to collapse/expand each docker panel
- Group dockers by tabs

Customisable Brushes and Brush Engine allows advanced users to create custom scripts on brush behavior, patternlike textures, geometrically shaped brushes and simulated blending through programming, most notably via Python plugin support however, other programming languages are also supported like Lua.

Workspaces allow UI customizations for different workflows to be saved and loaded on demand.

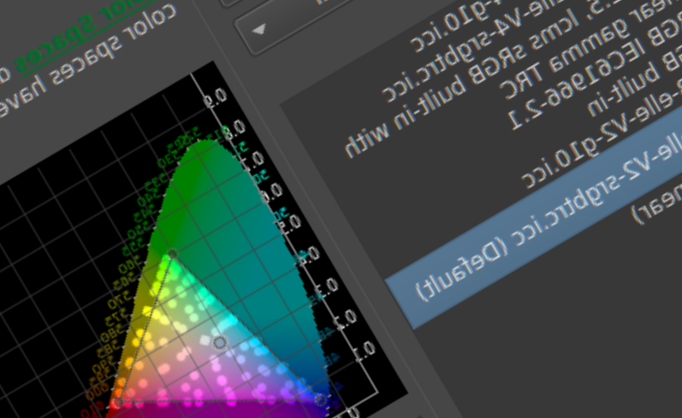
Text quality on Krita's OpenGL canvas with non-integer zooming, rotation and mirror

=== Display ===
OpenGL accelerated canvas is used to speed up Krita's performance. It provides the following benefits:

- Better framerate and response time: pen actions can be reflected without delay
- Better-quality, fast and continuous zooming, panning, rotation, wrap-around and mirroring
- Requires a GPU with OpenGL 3.0 support for optimal experience. In the case of Intel HD Graphics, that means Ivy Bridge and above.

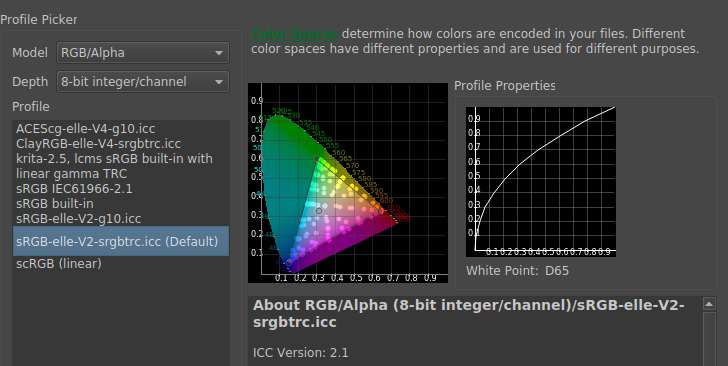
Krita's colour space loader

Full colour management is supported in Krita with the following capabilities:

- Assign and convert between colour spaces
- Realtime colour proofing, including colour-blind mode
- Colour model supported: RGBA, Grey Scale, CMYKA, Law, YCbCr, XYZ
- Colour depth supported: 8-bit integer, 16-bit integer, 16-bit floating point, 32-bit floating point

=== Filters ===
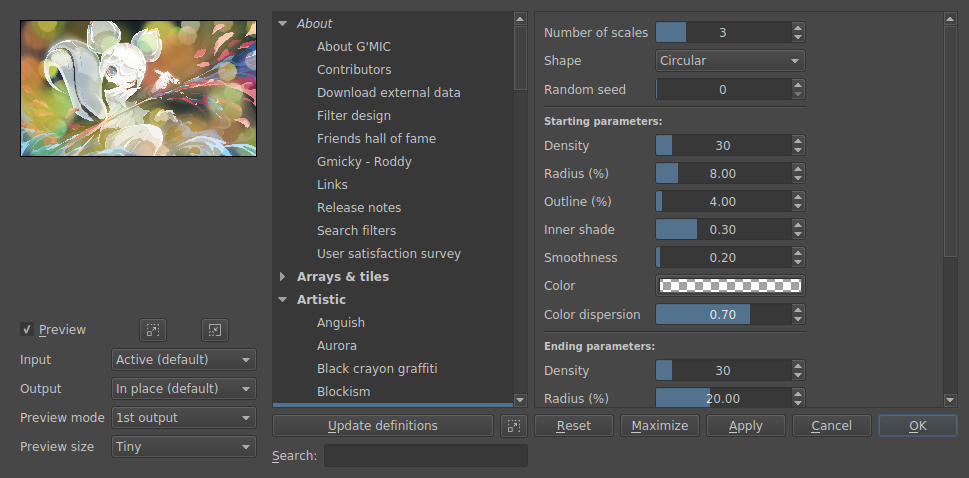
Krita's G'MIC filter controls

Krita has a collection of built-in filters and supports G'MIC filters. It has real-time filter preview support.

Filters included in a default installation: levels, colour adjustment curves, brightness/contrast curve, desaturate, invert, auto contrast, HSV adjustment, pixelise, raindrops, oil paint, gaussian blur, motion blur, blur, lens blur, colour to alpha, colour transfer, minimise channel, maximise channel, top/left/bottom/right edge detection, sobel, sharpen, mean removal, unsharp mask, gaussian noise removal, wavelet noise reducer, emboss horizontal only/in all directions/(laplacian)/vertical only/with variable depth/horizontal and vertical, small tiles, round corners, phong bumpmap.

=== File formats supported ===
Krita's native document format is Krita Document (.kra). It can also save to many other file formats including PSD.

	File formats
Save to	Krita Document, OpenRaster document, PSD image, PPM, PGM, PBM, PNG, GIF, JPEG, JPEG XL, Windows BMP, XBM, XPM, TIFF, EXR, Gimp image, WebP, SCML, ICO, TGA, CSV, QML
Import only	ODG draw, Krita Flipbook, Adobe DNG, Camera RAW, JPEG 2000, PDF, SVG, XML, XCF

== Sprint events ==
Krita sprints are events during which Krita developers and artists get together for a few days, exchange ideas and do programming face-to-face, in order to speedup development and improve relationships between members.

Year	Date	Place
2005	—N/a	Deventer, Netherlands
2010	26 February to 7 March	Deventer, Netherlands
2011	20 to 22 May	Amsterdam, Netherlands
2014	16 to 18 May	Deventer, Netherlands
2016	23 to 24 January	Deventer, Netherlands
2016	26 to 28 August	Deventer, Netherlands
2018	17 to 21 May	Deventer, Netherlands
2019	5 to 9 August	Deventer, Netherlands

== Variations ==
- Krita Gemini: optimised for tablets and touch interaction.
- Krita Studio: commercially supported version for movie and VFX studios.

== See also ==
- Comparison of raster graphics editors
- List of 2D animation software
- List of 2D graphics software
- List of digital art software
- List of free and open-source software image editors
- List of computing mascots

Similar programs

- GIMP
- Pixia
- MyPaint
- Clip Studio Paint
- Photoshop
- Paint Tool SAI
