= Graphics tablet =

Computer input device

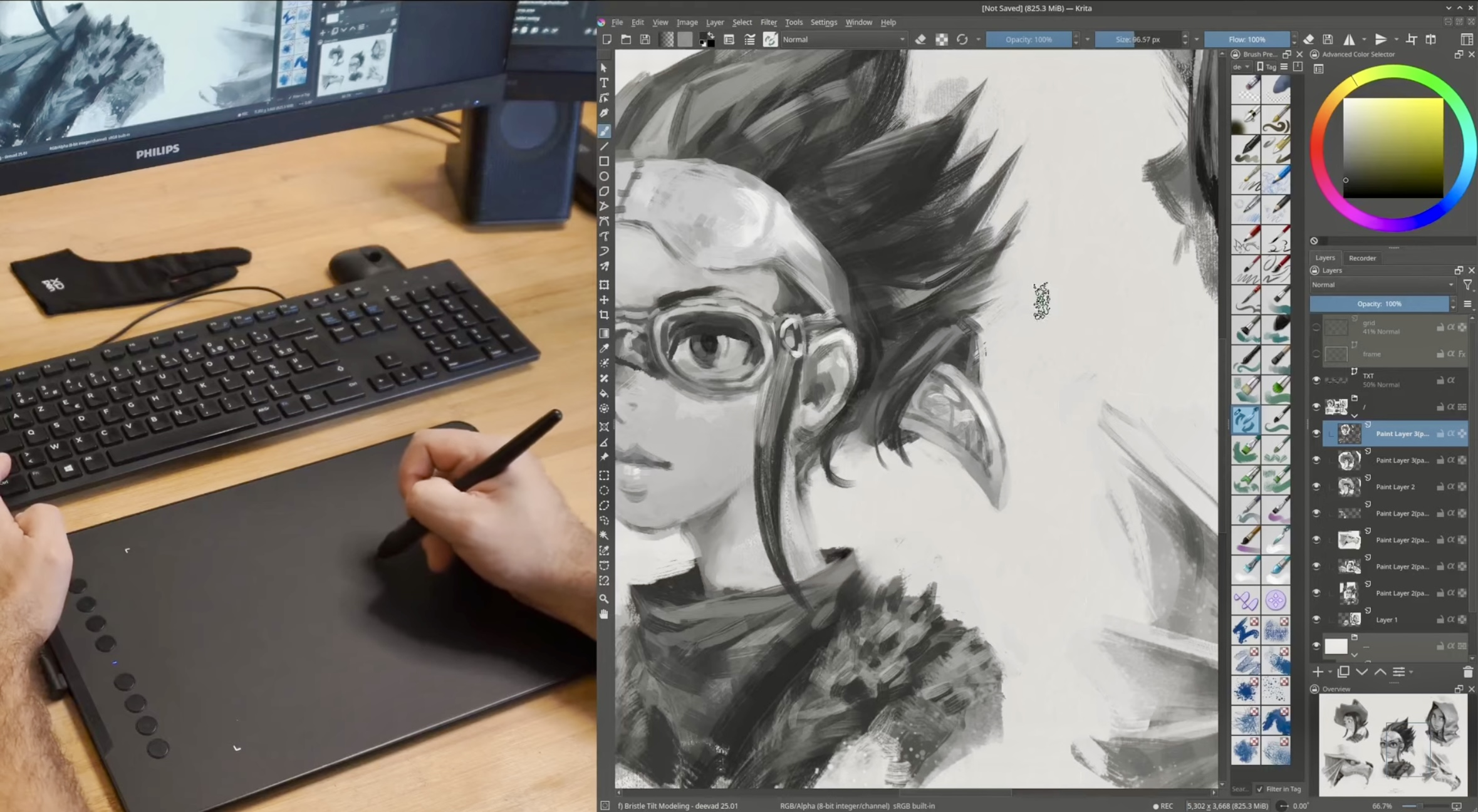
XP-PEN graphics tablet using Krita software

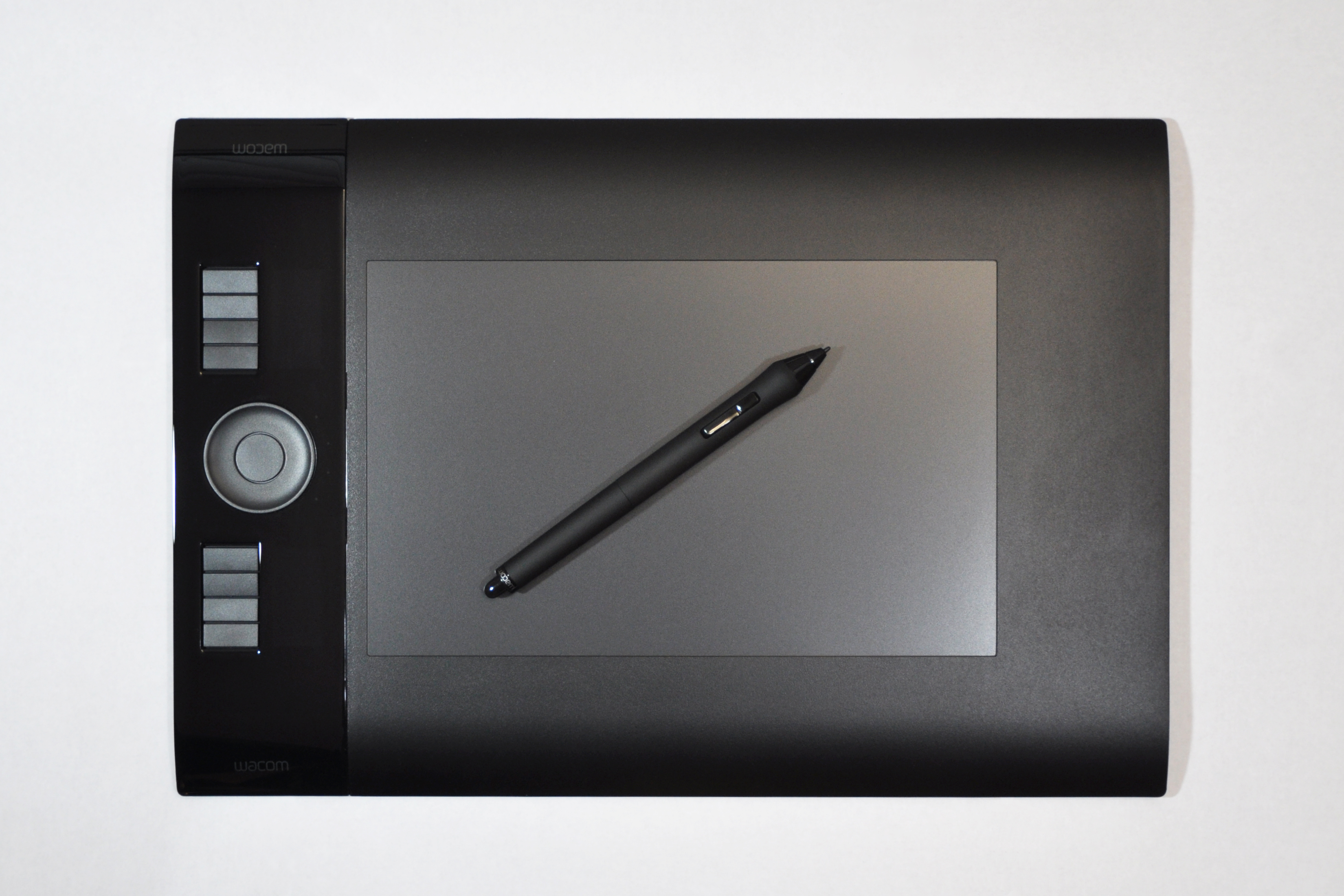
Wacom Intuos4 pen tablet with its pen

A graphics tablet (also known as a digitizer, digital graphic tablet, pen tablet, drawing tablet, external drawing pad or digital art board) is a computer input device that enables a user to hand draw or paint images, animations and graphics, with a special pen-like stylus, similar to the way a person draws pictures with a pencil and paper by hand.

Graphics tablets may also be used to capture data or handwritten signatures. They can also be used to trace an image from a piece of paper that is taped or otherwise secured to the tablet surface. Capturing data in this way, by tracing or entering the corners of linear polylines or shapes, is called digitizing.

The device consists of a rough surface upon which the user may "draw" or trace an image using the attached stylus, a pen-like drawing apparatus. The image is shown on the computer monitor, though some graphic tablets now also incorporate an LCD screen for a more realistic or natural experience and usability.

Some tablets are intended as a replacement for the computer mouse as the primary pointing and navigation device for desktop computers.

== History ==
The first electronic handwriting device was the Telautograph, patented by Elisha Gray in 1888.

The first graphic tablet resembling contemporary tablets and used for handwriting recognition by a computer was the Stylator in 1957. Better known (and often misstated as the first digitizer tablet) is the RAND Tablet also known as the Grafacon (for Graphic Converter), introduced in 1964. The RAND Tablet employed a grid of wires under the surface of the pad that encoded horizontal and vertical coordinates in a small electrostatic signal. The stylus received the signal by capacitive coupling, which could then be decoded back as coordinate information.

The acoustic tablet, or spark tablet, used a stylus that generated clicks with a spark plug. The clicks were then triangulated by a series of microphones to locate the pen in space. The system was fairly complex and expensive, and the sensors were susceptible to interference by external noise.

Digitizers were popularized in the mid-1970s and early 1980s by the commercial success of the ID (Intelligent Digitizer) and BitPad manufactured by the Summagraphics Corp. The Summagraphics digitizers were sold under the company's name but were also private labeled for HP, Tektronix, Apple, Evans and Sutherland and several other graphic system manufacturers. The ID model was the first graphics tablet to make use of what was at the time the new Intel microprocessor technology. This embedded processing power allowed the ID models to have twice the accuracy of previous models while still making use of the same foundation technology. Key to this accuracy improvement were two US Patents issued to Stephen Domyan, Robert Davis, and Edward Snyder. The Bit Pad model was the first attempt at a low-cost graphics tablet with an initial selling price of $555 when other graphics tablets were selling in the $2,000 to $3,000 price range. This lower cost opened up the opportunities for would be entrepreneurs to be able to write graphics software for a multitude of new applications. These digitizers were used as the input device for many high-end CAD (Computer-Aided Design) systems as well as bundled with PCs and PC-based CAD software like AutoCAD. These tablets used a magnetostriction technology which used wires made of a special alloy stretched over a solid substrate to accurately locate the tip of a stylus or the center of a digitizer cursor on the surface of the tablet. This technology also allowed Proximity or "Z" axis measurement.

In 1981, musician Todd Rundgren created the first color graphic tablet software for personal computers, which was licensed to Apple as the Utopia Graphic Tablet System.

In 1981, the Quantel Paintbox color graphic workstation was released; This model was equipped with the first pressure-sensitive tablet.

The first home computer graphic tablet was the KoalaPad, released in 1983. Though originally designed for the Apple II, the Koala eventually broadened its applicability to other home computers including the TRS-80 Color Computer, Commodore 64, and Atari 8-bit computers.

In the 1980s, several vendors of graphic tablets began to include additional functions, such as handwriting recognition and on-tablet menus.

== Characteristics ==
Typically tablets are characterized by size of the device, drawing area, its resolution size ("active area", which is measured in lpi), pressure sensitivity (level of varying the size of strokes with pressure), number of buttons and types and number of interfaces: Bluetooth, USB; etc. The actual drawing accuracy is restricted to pen's nib size.

== Types ==
There have been many attempts to categorize the technologies that have been used for graphic tablets:

Passive tablets
Passive tablets make use of electromagnetic induction technology, where the horizontal and vertical wires of the tablet operate as both transmitting and receiving coils (as opposed to the wires of the RAND Tablet which only transmit). The tablet generates an electromagnetic signal, which is received by the LC circuit in the stylus. The wires in the tablet then change to a receiving mode and read the signal generated by the stylus. Modern arrangements also provide pressure sensitivity and one or more buttons, with the electronics for this information present in the stylus. On older tablets, changing the pressure on the stylus nib or pressing a button changed the properties of the LC circuit, affecting the signal generated by the pen, which modern ones often encode into the signal as a digital data stream. By using electromagnetic signals, the tablet is able to sense the stylus position without the stylus having to even touch the surface, and powering the pen with this signal means that devices used with the tablet never need batteries. ActivSlate 50, the model used with Promethean whiteboards, also uses a hybrid of this technology.
Active tablets
Active tablets differ in that the stylus used contains self-powered electronics that generate and transmit a signal to the tablet. These styluses rely on an internal battery rather than the tablet for their power, resulting in a bulkier stylus. Eliminating the need to power the pen means that such tablets may listen for pen signals constantly, as they do not have to alternate between transmit and receive modes, which can result in less jitter.
Optical tablets
Optical tablets operate by a very small digital camera in the stylus and then doing pattern matching on the image of the paper. The most successful example is the technology developed by Anoto.
Acoustic tablets
Early models were described as spark tablets—a small sound generator was mounted in the stylus, and the acoustic signal was picked up by two microphones placed near the writing surface. Some modern designs can read positions in three dimensions.
Capacitive tablets
These tablets have also been designed to use an electrostatic or capacitive signal. Scriptel's designs are one example of a high-performance tablet detecting an electrostatic signal. Unlike the type of capacitive design used for touchscreens, the Scriptel design is able to detect the position of the pen while it is in proximity to or hovering above the tablet. Many multi-touch tablets use capacitive sensing.

For all these technologies, the tablet can use the received signal to also determine the distance of the stylus from the surface of the tablet, the tilt (angle from vertical) of the stylus, and other information in addition to the horizontal and vertical positions, such as clicking buttons of the stylus or the rotation of the stylus.

Compared to touchscreens, a graphic tablet generally offers much higher precision, the ability to track an object which is not touching the tablet, and can gather much more information about the stylus, but is typically more expensive, and can only be used with the special stylus or other accessories.

Some tablets, especially inexpensive ones aimed at young children, come with a corded stylus, using technology similar to older RAND tablets.

== Pucks ==
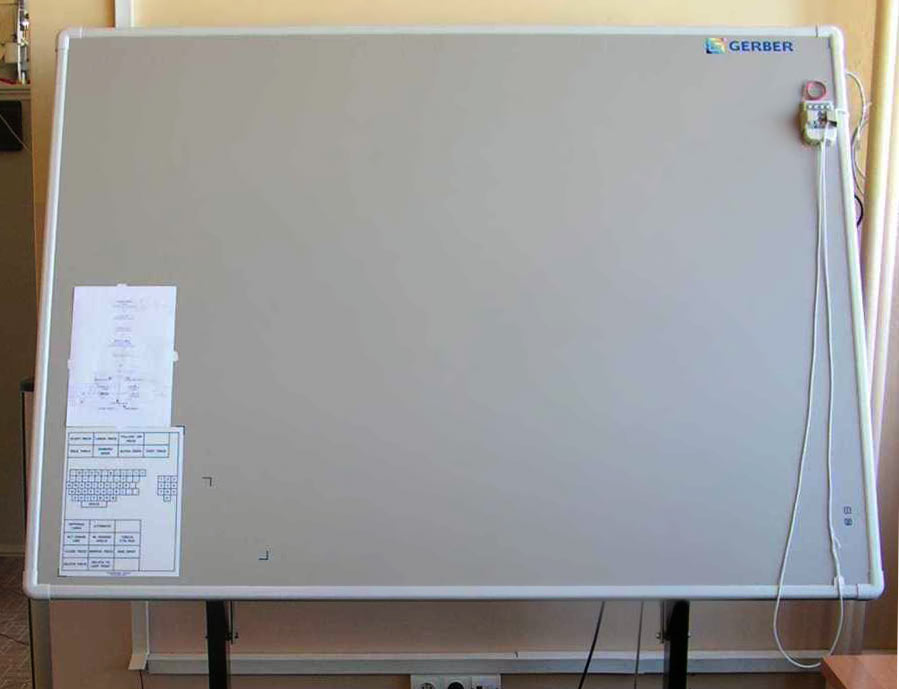
A large-format graphic tablet by manufacturer Summagraphics (OEM'd to Gerber): The puck's external copper coil can be clearly seen.

After styluses, pucks are the most commonly used tablet accessory. A puck is a mouse-like device that can detect its absolute position and rotation. This is opposed to a mouse, which can only sense its relative velocity on a surface (most tablet drivers are capable of allowing a puck to emulate a mouse in operation, and many pucks are marketed as a "mouse").

Pucks range in size and shape; some are externally indistinguishable from a mouse, while others are a fairly large device with dozens of buttons and controls. Professional pucks often have a reticle or loupe which allows the user to see the exact point on the tablet's surface targeted by the puck, for detailed tracing and computer aided design (CAD) work.

Pucks are used on the Microsoft Surface range and were recently used on the Dell Canvas. However, they have been largely discontinued by most manufacturers in favour of physical hotkeys and dials.

== Embedded LCD tablets ==
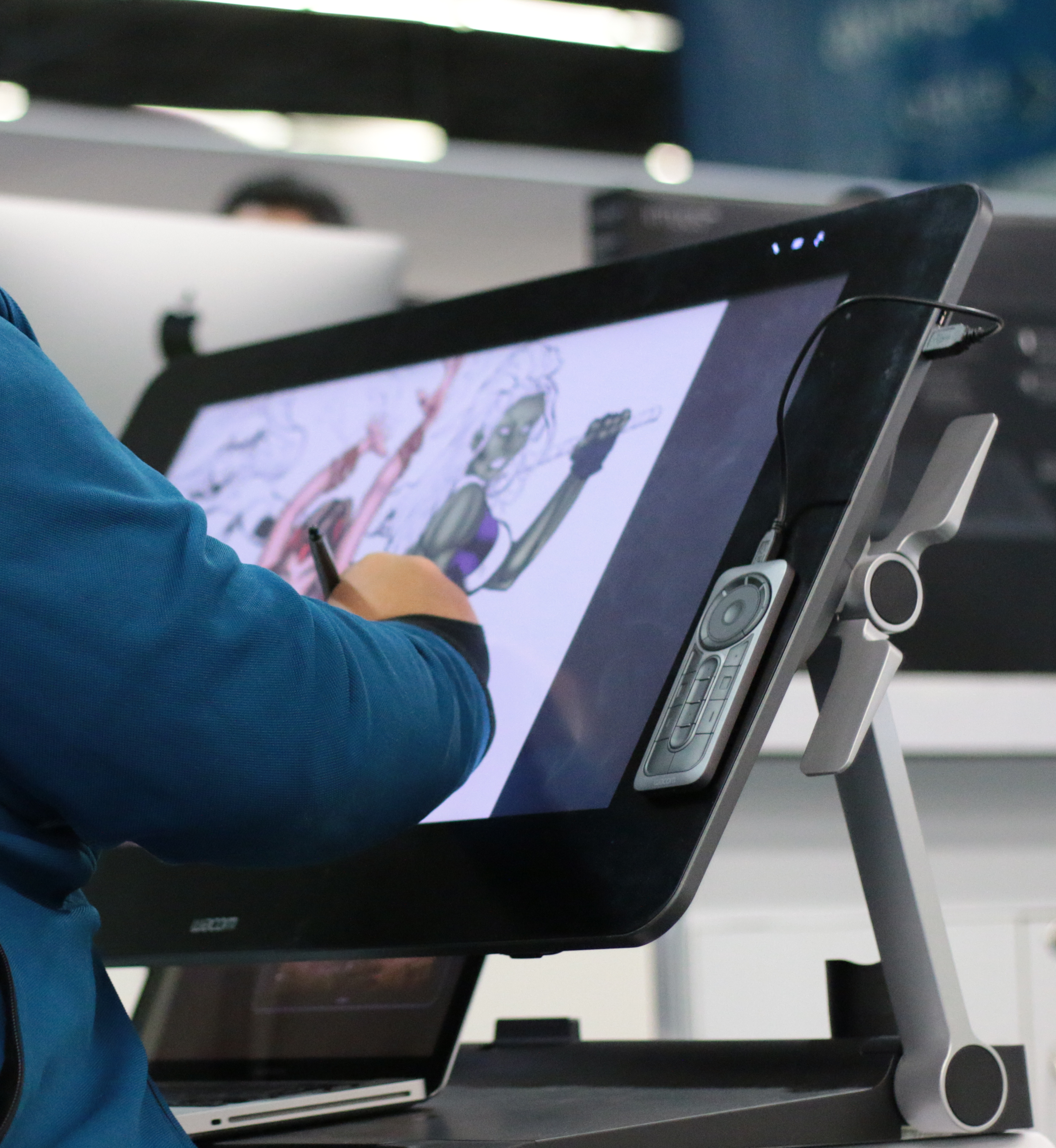
Wacom graphics tablet

Some graphics tablets incorporate an LCD into the tablet itself, allowing the user to draw or paint directly on the screen.

Graphics tablet/screen hybrids offer advantages over both standard PC touchscreens and ordinary graphics tablets. Unlike touchscreens, they offer pressure sensitivity, and their input resolution is generally higher. While their pressure sensitivity and resolution are typically no better than those of ordinary tablets, they offer the additional advantage of directly seeing the location of the physical pen device relative to the image on the screen. This often allows for increased accuracy and a more tactile, "real" feeling to the use of the device.

The graphics tablet manufacturer Wacom holds many patents on key technologies for graphics tablets, which forces competitors to use other technologies or license Wacom's patents. The displays are often sold for thousands of dollars. For instance, the Wacom Cintiq series ranges from just below US$1,000 to over US$2,000.

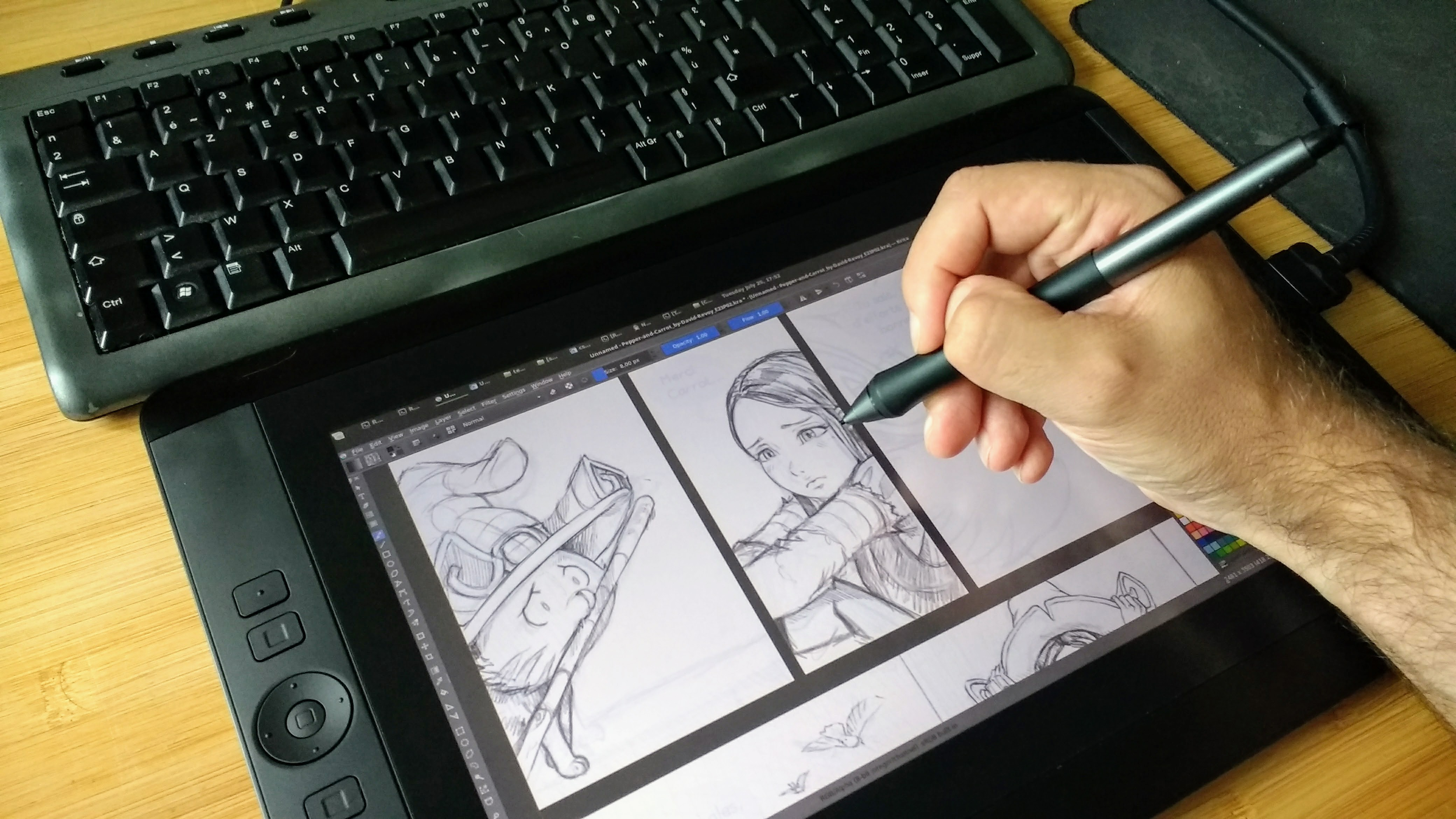
Sketching in Krita on a Wacom Cintiq 13HD graphics tablet/screen hybrid

Some commercially available graphics tablet/screen hybrids include:

- Monoprice 19-Inch Interactive Display
- Cintiq from Wacom
- Kamvas (e.g. Kamvas Studio 22) from Huion
- XP-PEN
- GAOMON
- Parblo
- ugee
- Xencelabs
- VEIKK
- IFlytek

There have also been do-it-yourself projects where conventional used LCD monitors and graphics tablets have been converted to a graphics tablet-screen hybrid.

== Uses ==
Graphic tablets, because of their stylus-based interface and ability to detect some or all of pressure, tilt, and other attributes of the stylus and its interaction with the tablet, are widely considered to offer a very natural way to create computer graphics, especially two-dimensional computer graphics. Indeed, many graphic packages can make use of the pressure (and, sometimes, stylus tilt or rotation) information generated by a tablet, by modifying the brush size, shape, opacity, color, or other attributes based on data received from the graphic tablet.

In East Asia, graphic tablets, known as "pen tablets", are widely used in conjunction with input-method editor software (IMEs) to write Chinese, Japanese, and Korean characters (CJK). The technology is popular and inexpensive and offers a method for interacting with the computer in a more natural way than typing on the keyboard, with the pen tablet supplanting the role of the computer mouse. Uptake of handwriting recognition among users who use alphabetic scripts has been slower.

Graphic tablets are commonly used in the artistic world. Using a pen-like stylus on a graphic tablet combined with a graphics-editing program, such as Illustrator, Photoshop by Adobe Systems, Corelpainter, or Krita gives artists a lot of precision when creating digital drawings or artwork. Photographers can also find that working with a graphic tablet during their post processing can really speed up tasks like creating a detailed layer mask or dodging and burning.

Educators make use of tablets in classrooms to project handwritten notes or lessons and to allow students to do the same, as well as providing feedback on student work submitted electronically. Online teachers may also use a tablet for marking student work, or for live tutorials or lessons, especially where complex visual information or mathematical equations are required. Students are also increasingly using them as note-taking devices, especially during university lectures while following along with the lecturer. They facilitate a smooth online teaching process and are popularly used along with face-cam to mimic the classroom experience.

Tablets are also popular for technical drawings and CAD, as one can typically put a piece of paper on them without interfering with their function.

Finally, tablets are gaining popularity as a replacement for the computer mouse as a pointing device. They can feel more intuitive to some users than a mouse, as the position of a pen on a tablet typically corresponds to the location of the pointer on the GUI shown on the computer screen. Those artists using a pen for graphic work may, as a matter of convenience, use a tablet and pen for standard computer operations rather than put down the pen and find a mouse. Popular rhythm game osu! allows utilizing a tablet as a way of playing.

Graphic tablets are available in various sizes and price ranges; A6-sized tablets being relatively inexpensive and A3-sized tablets far more expensive. Modern tablets usually connect to the computer via a USB or HDMI interface.

== Similar devices ==
Interactive whiteboards offer high-resolution wall-sized graphic tablets up to 95" (241,3 cm) along with options for pressure and multiple input. These are becoming commonplace in schools and meeting rooms around the world.

Earlier resistive touch screen devices (like PDAs, early smartphones, tablet PCs, and the Nintendo DS) were typically equipped with styluses, but accuracy of stylus input was very limited.

The more modern capacitive touch screens such as those found on some table computers, tablet computers and laptops operate in similar ways, but they usually use either optical grids or a pressure-sensitive film instead so do not need a special pointing device. Some of the latest models with capacitive input can be equipped with specialized styluses, and then these input devices can be used similarly to a full-function graphics tablet.

A graphic tablet is also used for Audio-Haptic products where blind or visually impaired people touch swelled graphics on a graphic tablet and get audio feedback from that. The product that is using this technology is called Tactile Talking Tablet or T3.

== See also ==
- Handwriting movement analysis
- Digital art education
- Digital image
- Light pen
- Pantograph
- Pen computing
- List of iPads with Apple Pencil support
