= Acoustic tablet =

An acoustic tablet, also known as a spark tablet, is a form of graphics tablet that uses sound to locate the position of the stylus within the drawing area.

The general functionality of acoustic tablets is based on a sound-emitting stylus and microphones that are used to record the sound. The current position of the stylus can be calculated according to the difference in the timing of the recorded sound. The sound can, for example, be a small electrical discharge that is emitted when the stylus is placed near the surface of the tablet.

Acoustic tablets have a long technological history, as seen from this 1971 patent by Science Accessories Corporation. Acoustic tablets are a convenient way to make a digitizing tablet for a very large surface area, as in the products.

== See also ==
- Graphics tablet
