= Monoprice =

American online retailer

Monoprice, Inc.
- Industry: Consumer Electronics
- Founded: 2002; 24 years ago
- Headquarters: Rancho Cucamonga, California, United States
- Products: Cables, Adapters, HDMI Cable, Professional Audio, Computer Accessories, Home Theater
- Number of employees: 150
- Parent: YFC-BonEagle Electric Co., Ltd.
- Website: www.monoprice.com

Monoprice is an American online retailer that sells generic-branded consumer electronics under its namesake private label, as well as name brand consumer electronics and outdoor equipment. The company is based in Rancho Cucamonga, California.

The office and shipping operations are run out of a 173,000 square-foot warehouse. As of 2013, Monoprice is a $120 million-a-year business.

== History ==
Monoprice was founded in 2002 by Jong Lee.

On February 5, 2013, Monoprice released new products at the Consumer Electronics Show in Las Vegas, including an IPS panel monitor and a small portable video camera called the MHD Action Camera.

In March 2013, Monoprice was sued by Klipsch, an American loudspeaker company, for patent infringement for the latter's Energy Take Classic 5.1 system. Monoprice had to withdraw its 5.1 Hi-Fi Home Theater Satellite Speakers & Subwoofer system.

On July 7, 2013, Monoprice started selling its own brand of proprietary guitars.

On August 22, 2013, Blucora acquired Monoprice for $180 million in an all-cash deal.

On August 27, 2013, Monoprice joined the Electronic Entertainment Expo (E3), with PC gaming products including gaming mice, mechanical keyboards, PC speakers, and 7.1 surround sound headsets.

On January 23, 2014, Monoprice returned to the NAMM Show with new professional audio products, including guitars, bass guitars, DJ products, speakers, and stage lighting products.

On June 25, 2014, Monoprice's parent company, Blucora, Inc. announced the appointment of Bernard W. Luthi as President of its Monoprice subsidiary. As President, Luthi was to oversee the operations of the Monoprice e-commerce business. Luthi previously was COO and CMO of Rakuten.com and Buy.com and SVP of Marketing, Merchandising and Web Management for Newegg.com

On November 18, 2016, Monoprice and YFC-BonEagle Electric Co., Ltd. (YFC), a Taiwan-based provider of power cord sets and networking peripherals, announced that YFC acquired Monoprice in a cash transaction valued at $40 million.

In 2019, The Mediahq named the Monoprice Voxel as the Best Intermediate 3D printer for 2019.

On September 1, 2021, Monoprice opened a 165,400-square-foot distribution center in Hebron, KY. The warehouse ships 70% of its total direct-to-consumer volume.
