= Public Records (venue) =

Music venue and eatery in Gowanus, Brooklyn

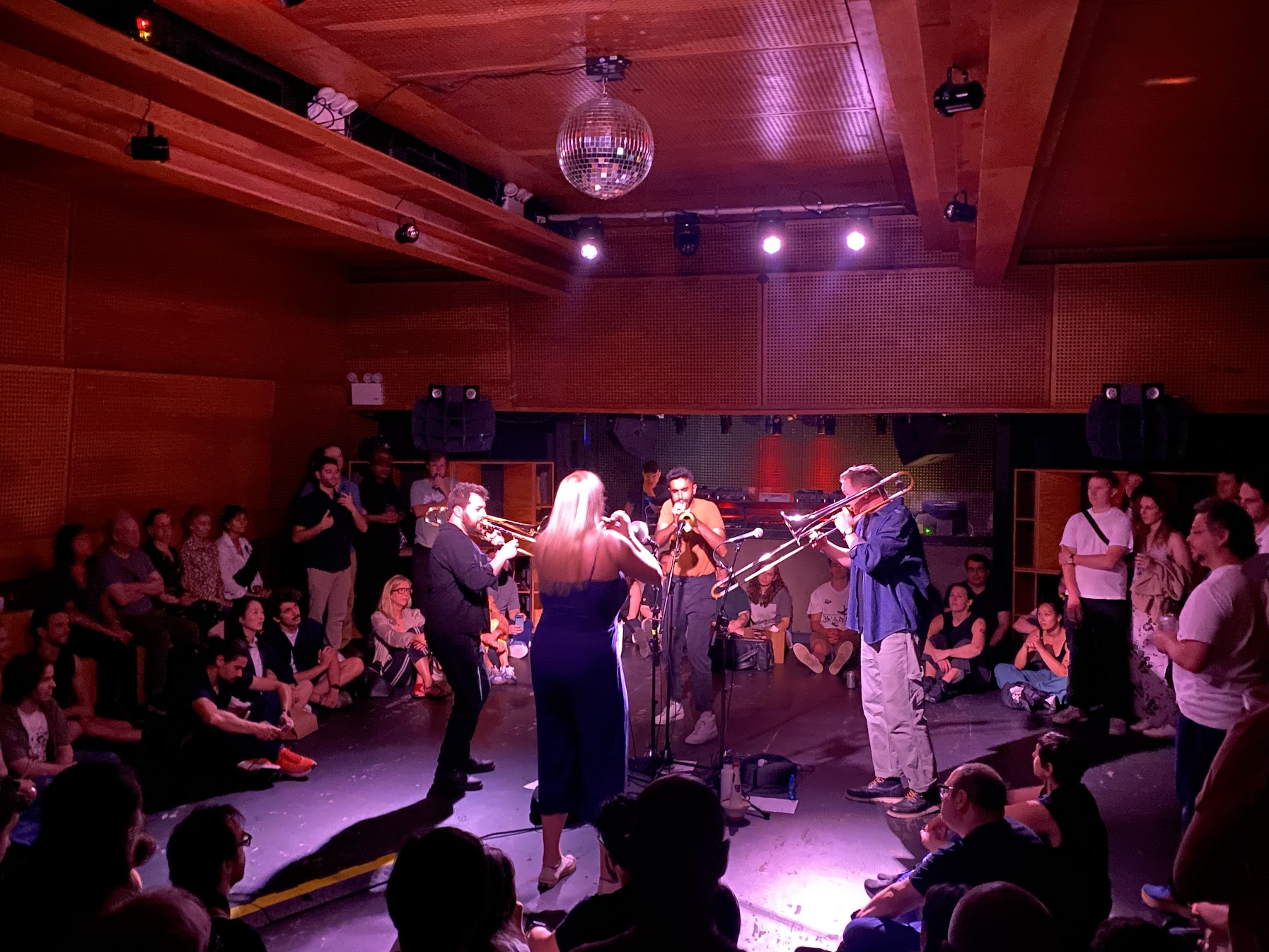
- The Westerlies at Public Records in 2025
- Interactive map of Public Records
- Address: 233 Butler Street; Gowanus, Brooklyn, New York 11211; United States
- Coordinates: 40°40′55.95″N 73°59′11.11″W
- Owner: Erik VanderWal; Francis Harris; Shane Davis
- Type: Music venue, listening room, bar, café, and store

Construction
- Opened: April 2019
- Expanded: December 2022

Website
- publicrecords.nyc

Public Records is a music venue, bar, and eatery in Gowanus, Brooklyn. By day, the space serves as a vegan café and wine bar; by night, it features a nightclub and performance complex. The venue is known for eclectic programming, with a focus on electronic music.

== History ==
Public Records was founded by hospitality director Erik VanderWal, musician Francis Harris and designer Shane Davis. It opened in April 2019, part of a wave of adaptive reuse projects in the historically industrial Gowanus neighborhood. The property's second floor was occupied by the guitar repairer and supplier Retrofret until 2022, at which point Public Records took over the space and opened the Upstairs Lounge. In 2024, the venue's founders created the Public Service agency to consult with developers on design-centric hospitality projects.

In 2020, Esquire named Public Records one of the 27 "best bars in America," noting the quality of the establishment's sound systems and cohesive sense of flow. The actresses Abbi Jacobson and Jodi Balfour were married at Public Records in 2024.

== Facilities ==
Located at 233 Butler Street, Public Records covers 6,000 square feet (560 m^{2}) in a 1910s-era building formerly used as an ASPCA office and animal shelter. The Sound Room, the central performance area hosting both live music and DJ sets, is a minimalist space featuring perforated plywood acoustic panels, with capacity for up to 200 attendees. The room's sound system has been widely praised for its clarity and high fidelity. Genres featured have included avant-garde jazz and experimental music.

The Upstairs Lounge, an intimate cocktail bar and listening space, was designed by Studio Kos and engineered by Arup Group. The property's former parking lot was converted into the Nursery, an indoor-outdoor dining space and dance floor featuring a modular DJ booth. Davis told Fast Company the Nursery is "temporal; something that could be disassembled," assembled using timber and polycarbonate shipping containers.

The Atrium restaurant centers vegan cuisine, with a menu designed by former Little Pine executive chef Lou Oates. Per Time Out New York, the restaurant's "innovative dishes," including Spanish fried rice, deconstructed vegan pastrami, and fermented bok choy, "still feel a touch overpriced." Visitors can purchase records and zines at the adjoining Café Public, which serves coffee, pastries, and sandwiches.
