= Michael Winstone =

English sculptor

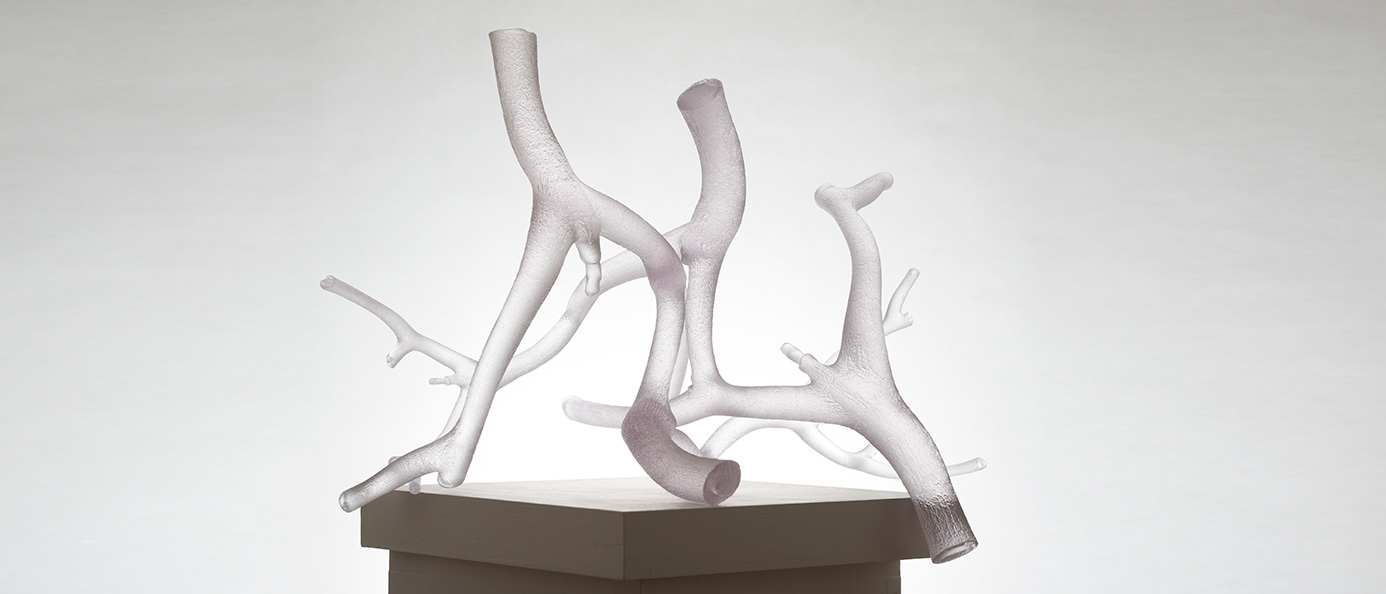
51°28'11.0"N 0°12'53.0"W (Holm Oak, Quercus ilex) Fulham Palace, London, UK. 2015. Digital Sculpture. Bark data taken from 500-year-old Holm tree growing in the Fulham Palace Gardens, London, UK.

Michael Winstone (born 1958, Toronto) is an English sculptor.

== Biography ==
Winstone studied Fine Art at Leeds Polytechnic from 1978 to 1981 and sculpture at the Royal College of Art from 1981 to 1984.

His early work encompassed a wide range of traditional materials completing commissions for rural and city spaces. He was Artist in residence Grizedale Forest 1984 and Artist in Residence Gateshead 1985.

In 1992 his focus shifted to creating art mainly within the digital domain. This included a wide range of digital media, 2D and 3D digital sculptures and prints as well as 4D time-based installation and video animation. At the time he called this work "Sculputer" an acronym of the word sculpture and computer, it is now widely referred to as Digital sculpture.

The sculptures examine the human body within the context of the family structure, its relationship with nature, in particular the anatomy of trees and their architecture. Using various CAD programs, Lightwave 3D Modo 3D-Coat Zbrush, Simple fractal elements are displaced and repeated to create complex organic structures that have self-similarity in anatomic texture, body and construction. The results are then printed to scale using 3D Printing technology.

Each digital work is based on a specific tree. The title is the GPS coordinates of where that tree grew or is growing. Data from its bark is scanned into the computer. The model preserves the bark striations and growth formations of real trees that no longer exist, as well as current trees that may be lost in the future. The elements within the work grow in the same way human, animal, and plants tissues regenerate as substrates. They are informed and infused with environmental forces which then grow into complex intertwined sculptural structures.

Major digital commissions include "41º40'00'’N.00º54'30'’W. (White Willow Tree, Salix alba)" an eight-metre digital print cast in bronze for the Zaragoza Expo 2008.

== Gallery ==
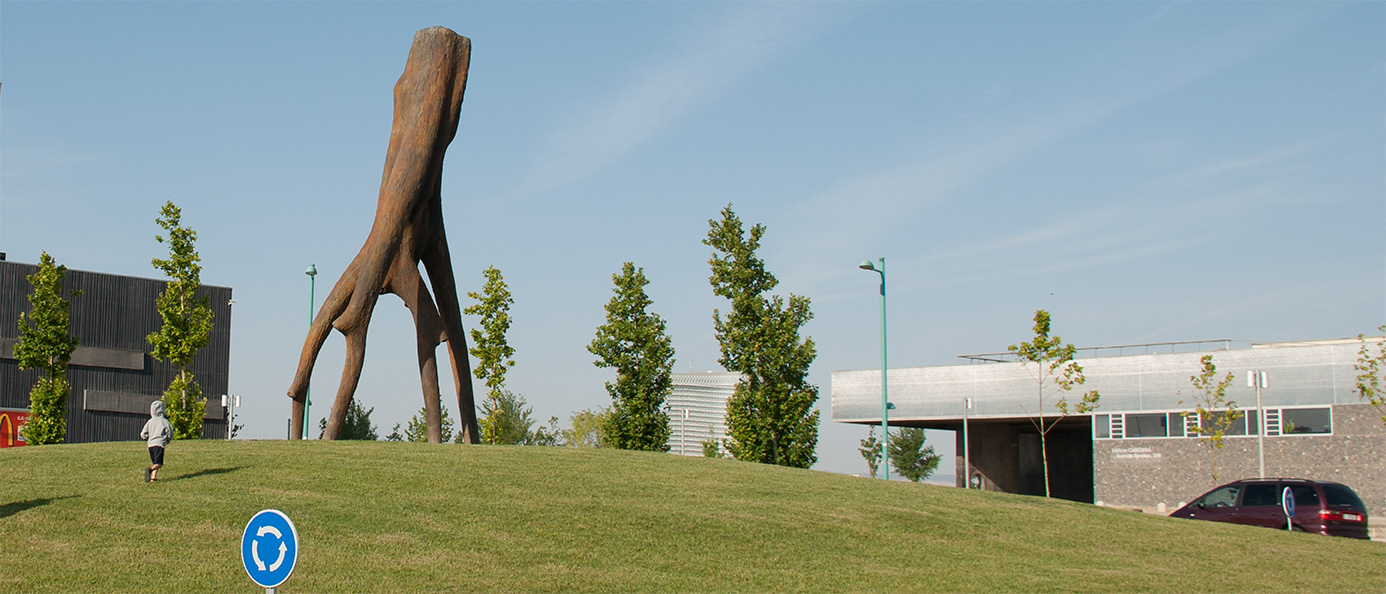
,
41º40'00'’N.00º54'30'’W. (White Willow Tree, Salix alba), 2008

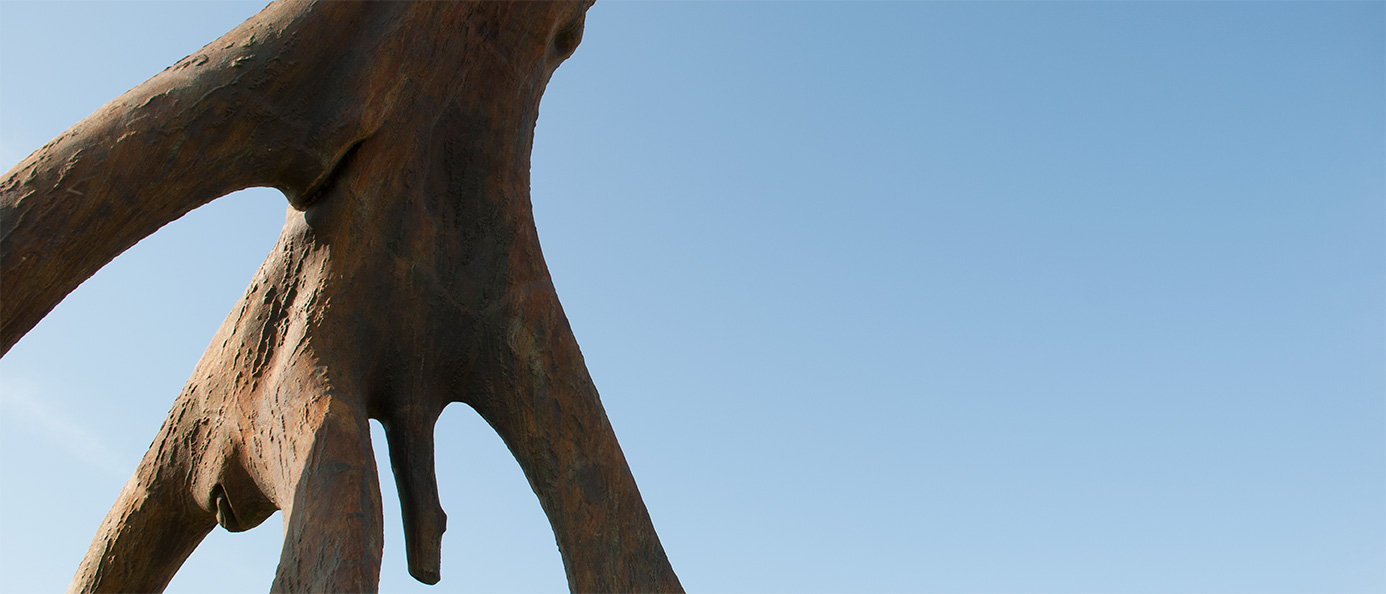
,
41º40'00'’N.00º54'30'’W. (White Willow Tree, Salix alba), 2008

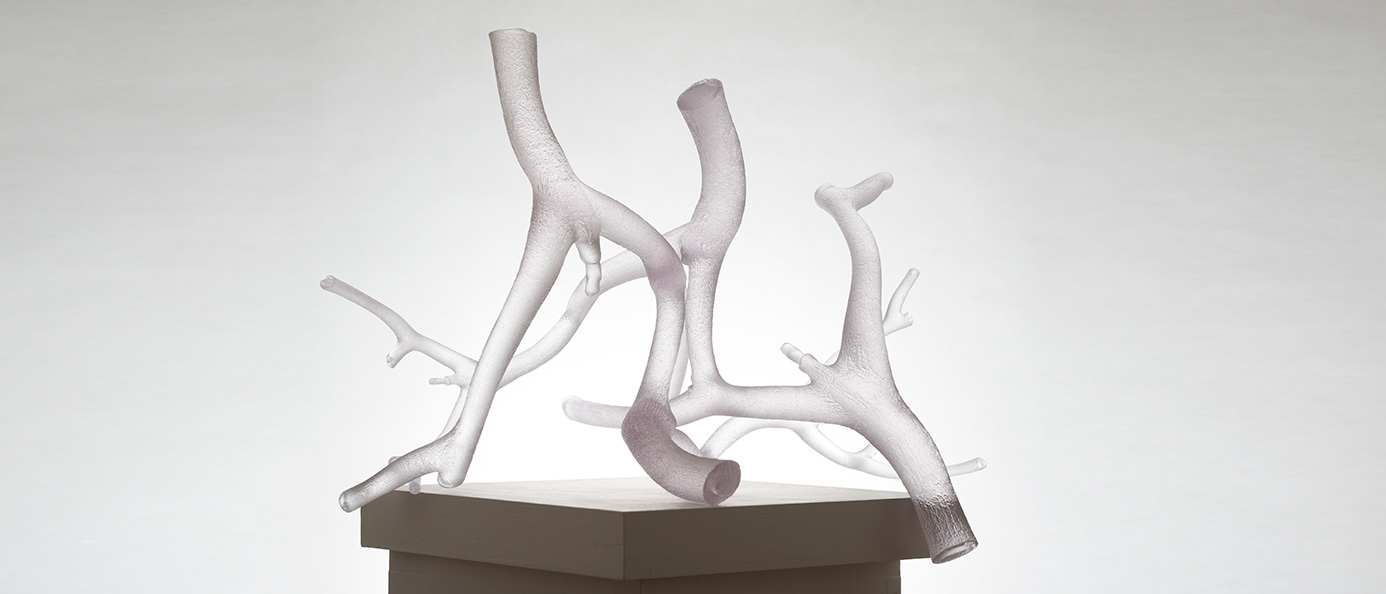
,
51°28'11.0"N 0°12'53.0"W (Holm Oak, Quercus ilex), 2015

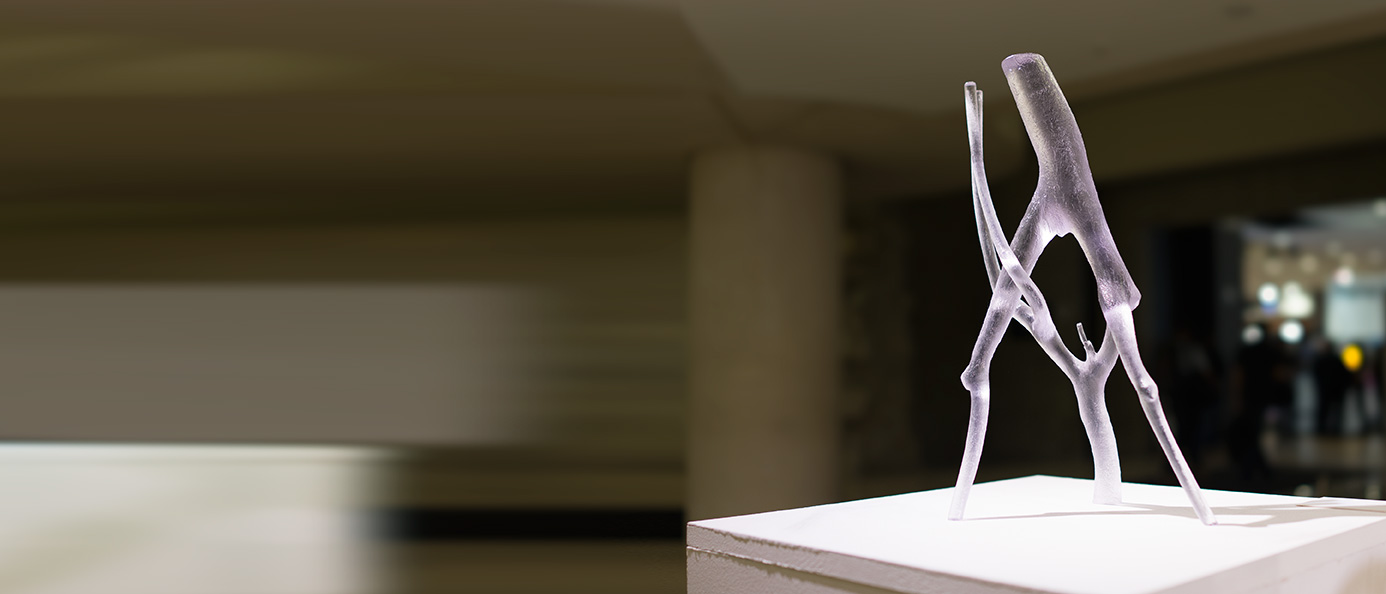
,
51°5'28"N 0°1'55"E - i (Judas-Tree, Cercis-Canadensis),2015

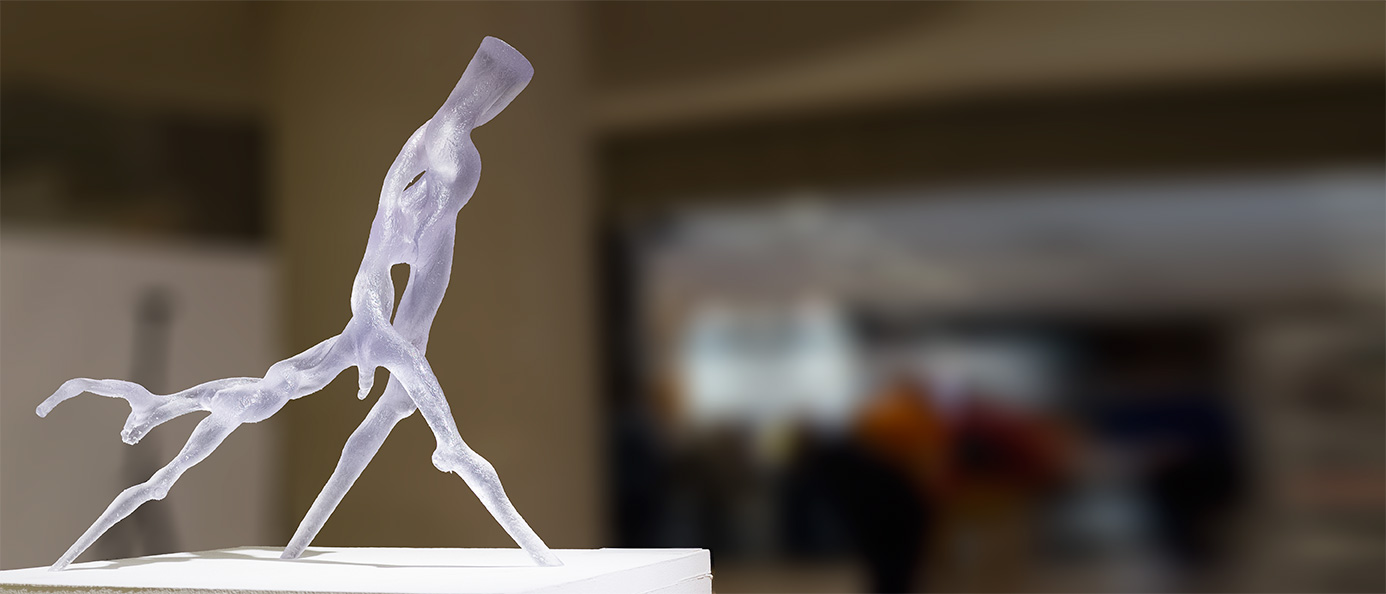
,
51°28'55.0"N 0°17'31.1"W (Pagoda tree, Styphnolobium japonicum), 2014

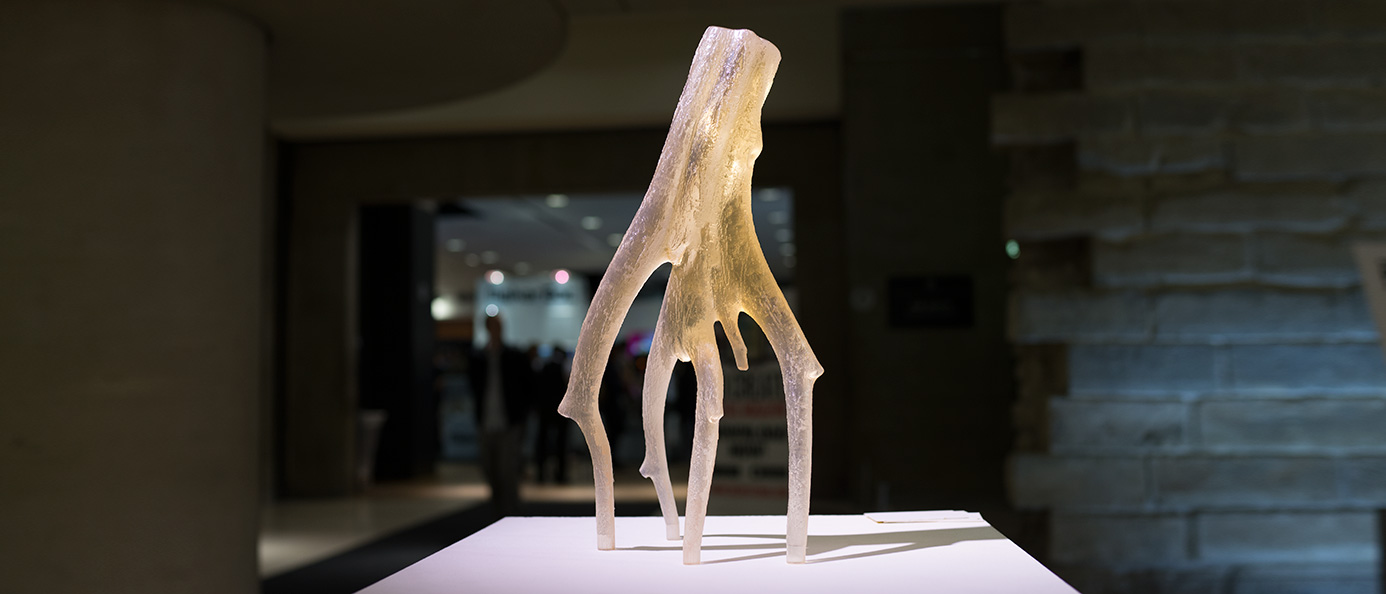
,
41º40'00'’N.00º54'30'’W. (White Willow Tree, Salix alba). Study, 2008

== Bibliography ==
Publications and television

- Exploring the best 3D print art, technology and trends Interview, [Tom May. 3DWorld Magazine No. 199 Oct 2015]
- Navacerrada 1st Bienal de Arte Publico para un itinerio y Turistico, [Catalogue of the exhibition. Ayuntamiento de Navacerrada. 2008]
- Public sculpture of North-East England, [Paul Usherwood. Book. 2000]
- Critical Faculty, [Catalogue of the exhibition. Stanley Picker Gallery UK. 1998]
- The Planner. Journal of the Royal Town Planning Institute, [Front cover, article. 1991]
- The Grizedale Experience, [Bill Grant and Paul Harris. Book. 1986]
- The Gallery, [BBC 2 TV Art Programme. Television. 1985]
- A sense of place, [Peter Davis. Book. 1984]
- International Garden Festival Liverpool, Festival Sculpture Catalogue. [Foreword by Sue Grayson and introduction by Richard Cork. 1984]
