= Oculus Medium =

Digital sculpting software

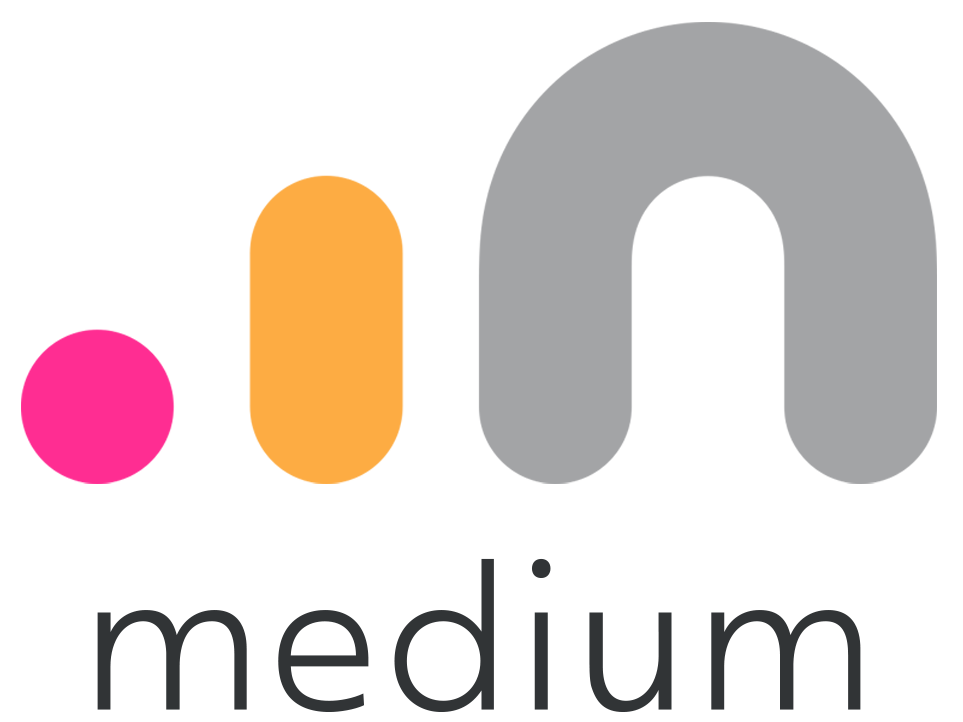
- Developer: Oculus VR
- Initial release: December 5, 2016
- Operating system: Windows 10 or later
- Available in: English
- Type: 3D computer graphics
- Website: www.oculus.com/medium/

Oculus Medium is a digital sculpting software that works with virtual reality headsets and 6DoF motion controllers. It is used to create and paint digital sculptures. Medium works only on Oculus Rift. It was released on December 5, 2016, following with a major update in 2018 introducing new features and a revamped UI. On December 9, 2019, Oculus Medium was acquired by Adobe and re-named to "Medium by Adobe".

== See also ==
- ZBrush
- Tilt Brush
- Mudbox
