= Maxon Computer GmbH =

German software company

- Industry: Computer graphics Benchmark
- Founded: 1985; 41 years ago
- Founder: Harald Egel, Uwe Bärtels and Harald Schneider
- Headquarters: Bad Homburg, Germany
- Area served: Worldwide
- Key people: CEO David McGavran
- Products: Cinema 4D; ZBrush; Redshift (renderer); Red Giant; Forger; Universe; Cinebench
- Owner: Nemetschek (2000–present)
- Number of employees: 300
- Website: maxon.net

Maxon Computer GmbH is a German software company that produces software for content creators. The company’s product lines include the 3D software Cinema 4D, the Red Giant tools for editing, motion design and filmmaking, Redshift renderer and the digital sculpting and painting software ZBrush as well as the mobile sculpting app Forger. The company’s cross-platform benchmarking application Cinebench is used by developers, reviewers and users to evaluate hardware performance.

== History ==
Maxon was founded in 1985 by three college students, Harald Egel, Uwe Bärtels and Harald Schneider. They had purchased their first computer, an Atari ST, and agreed to write a book about the basic programming language that ran on the ATARI ST, the GFA-BASIC Buch.

The first issue of ST-Computer was released in January 1986.

In 1991, after two years of development, the first version of Cinema 4D was launched in December 1993. This was followed in May 1994 with an upgrade to Cinema 4D V1.5, with improvements in rendering quality. Cinema 4D became Maxon Computer's flagship product.

In January 2000, Nemetschek, a leader in architectural CAD Software, bought a 70% stake in Maxon in order to acquire a high-quality renderer for their CAD models, as well as to enter the multimedia market and later introduced version 6 of Cinema 4D XL

Cinema 4D Release 10 was presented in 2006.

Announcement of Cinema 4D Release 11 at Siggraph show, Los Angeles, in 2008.

The company's program Cinebench is used to test computer hardware capabilities. The most recent version is R23 released in 2020.

Maxon is considered one of the major companies in 3D animation and graphics.

Maxon acquired Redshift in mid-2019, merged with Red Giant, creators of unique tools for editors, VFX artists, and motion designers later that year, and acquired Pixologic, the makers of ZBrush in 2021.
