= Grizedale Forest =

Natural area in North West England

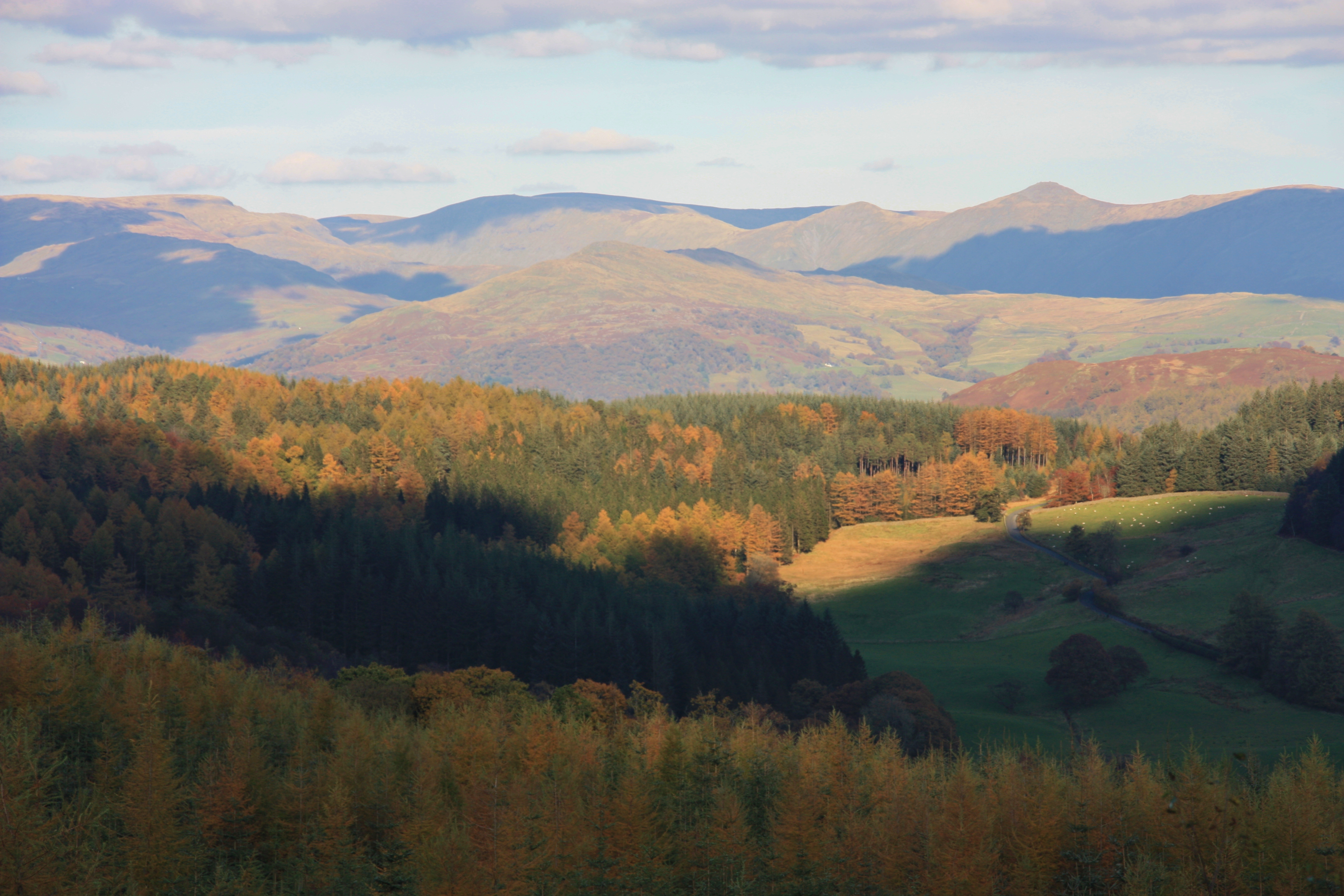
- View of the northern part of Grizedale Forest
- Interactive map of Grizedale Forest
- Location: Lake District, England
- Nearest city: Lancaster, Lancashire
- Coordinates: 54°20′25″N 3°01′25″W
- Area: 24.47 km^{2} (9.45 sq mi)
- Visitors: 200,000 (in 2006)
- Governing body: National Trust and the Lake District National Park Authority

Grizedale Forest is a 24.47 km^{2} area of woodland in the Lake District of North West England, located to the east of Coniston Water and to the south of Hawkshead. Historically, within the county of Lancashire, it now lies in the Westmorland and Furness district of Cumbria.

== Geography ==
It is made up of a number of hills, small tarns and the settlements of Grizedale and Satterthwaite. It is owned and managed by Forestry England and is a popular tourist destination with waymarked footpaths, mountain biking, an aerial assault course, a 16-bed hostel, and a visitor centre with a children's playground, education centre, café and shop. The car-parking of Grizedale Forest Visitors Centre is situated on the site of the former Grizedale Hall where its remains can be still seen. In past years, several stages on the WRC RAC Rally were held on tracks through Grizedale Forest every winter. Weather permitting, the forest continues to be used for two annual rallies: the Malcolm Wilson Rally and the Grizedale Stages Rally, based in Coniston.

== Plants and animals ==
The forest retains large expanses of exotic forestry trees such as Sitka spruce and Western hemlock, although more recent plantations of deciduous native trees have been made. Larch and ash dieback diseases have brought significant clearances in some areas. The forest is home to many birds and mammals including buzzards, sparrow hawks, owls, woodpeckers, woodcock, black grouse, red and grey squirrels, pine martens, badgers, stoats, foxes, red and roe deer.

== History ==
The name Grizedale means Valley of the Pigs. It is home to the last native herd of red deer. Historically, Grizedale formed part of Lancashire North of the Sands. The last standing Grizedale Hall was built in 1905 by Harold Brocklebank. During World War II it was used as a prisoner of war camp for German Officers, one of whom famously managed to escape. Brocklebank sold the Grizedale Estate to Forestry England in 1937. The Hall was demolished in 1957.

== Sculpture trail & Grizedale Arts ==
Several hundred sculptures have been sited in Grizedale Forest. The project was started by Bill Grant OBE, who formed the Grizedale Society in 1977, supported by Peter Davies of Northern Arts. Grant, an arts enthusiast who worked for the Forestry Commission, encouraged young artists to experiment and make work outdoors alongside and assisted by Grizedale's foresters, a practice which echoed innovations in international art movements of the time, in particular that of American Land Art. These early artists-in-residence were supported for up to 6 months, with the resulting al fresco sculptures being collectively marketed as a 'sculpture trail'. Notable sculptors included David Nash, Sally Matthews, Andy Goldsworthy, Robert Koenig, Walter Bailey and Michael Winstone. The project was awarded the 1990 Prudential Award for the Arts “In tribute for a leap of imagination that has enriched our perception and understanding of art in the landscape”. Many works from this era were constructed of naturally biodegradable materials, and have since disappeared into forest vegetation.

In 1997, after a period of financial difficulties and dwindling audiences that saw Grant's performing arts venture The Theatre In The Forest close, Grant stepped down as Director of the Grizedale Society. Adam Sutherland MBE was appointed his replacement in 1999 and formed Grizedale Arts, a new organisation which merged with the Grizedale Society. Sutherland suspended the forest-based residency programme and focused on bringing a younger generation of contemporary artists to the Lake District, holding a series of pop culture-flavoured artist-led events at the Grizedale Centre, including 2000's The Festival of Lying (by artist collective People From Off) which featured writer Jon Ronson alongside storytellers from Cumbria's World's Biggest Liar competition, and 2001's The Great Escape (featuring actor Don Estelle).

In the following decade Sutherland curated a series of influential touring shows influenced by the Lake District's cultural and economic themes, including Roadshow (2003) & MoMA PS1 collaboration Romantic Detachment (2004-5). In Let's Get Married Today (2003) Grizedale Arts supported two couples to hold their weddings in Grizedale Forest, with elaborate services orchestrated and embellished with many artist's interventions.

The working relationship between Grizedale Arts and the Forestry Commission (now Forestry England) ended in 2005, with Grizedale Arts granting the Forestry Commission a license to continue to exhibit and maintain the remaining forest sculptures. The Forestry Commission in turn leased the art organisation Lawson Park, a derelict farmstead on the edge of Grizedale Forest above the eastern shores of Coniston Water. Sutherland led a £1.2 million refurbishment of the property, resulting in a RIBA Award-winning artists' residency and warden accommodation set in 12 acres of land, opened by Sir Nicholas Serota & Eric Robson in 2009. The extensive gardens, developed by artist / film maker Karen Guthrie, have opened for the National Garden Scheme and in 2023 featured on the BBC's Gardeners' World. The organisation hosts a members' club and volunteers and artists in residence of all disciplines at Lawson Park, supporting their contributions to wide-ranging social and cultural projects.

Forestry England continues to promote Grizedale Forest's historic Sculpture Trail, to hold periodic exhibitions and residencies, and to commission further forest sculptures.

== Recreation ==
Grizedale Forest was one of the first Forestry England forests in England to allow members of the public to visit. Initially visitors came to watch wildlife, with several high hides positioned around the forest for bird watching. In 1977 the sculpture trail was created, siting artworks along the 10 mile long Silurian Way footpath. Subsequent footpaths were created across the forest with different coloured marker posts providing walks for different levels of ability. More recently focus has turned to other forms of recreation including mountain biking, Go Ape, and Segway hire. One quarter of the 200,000 visitors to Grizedale per year cycle. A new 9.7 mile mountain biking trail, the £167,000 North Face Trail, was opened in March 2006. The highest point within Grizedale Forest is the 314 m high Carron Crag, overlooking a wooden panopticon sculptures. At the forest along the trail there is a high ropes course which consists of ziplines, rope crossings and Tarzan swings. There is a 10-year-old age limit and a minimum height of 4 ft 7 inches (139.4 cm).

=== Gallery ===
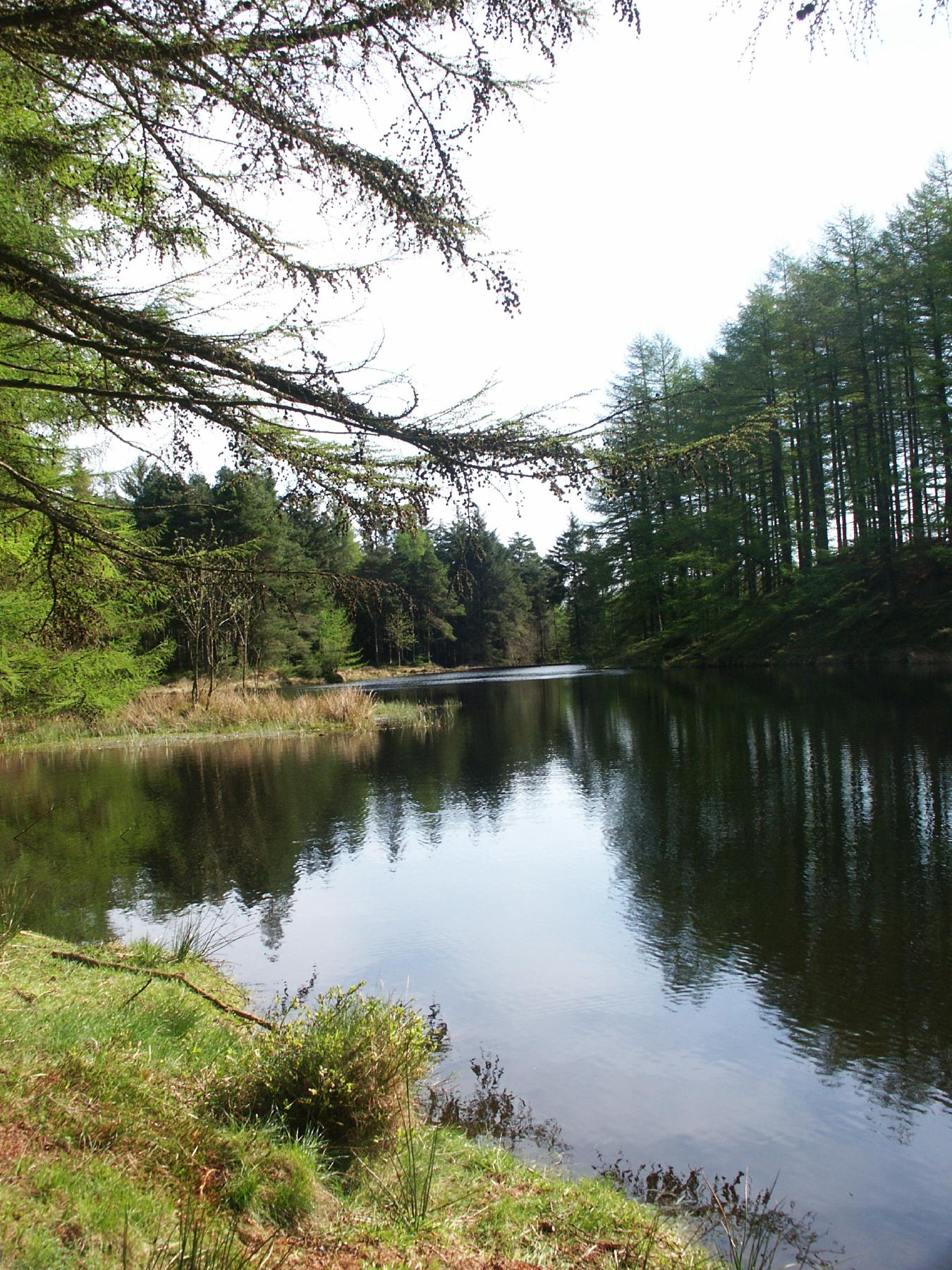
Grizedale Tarn

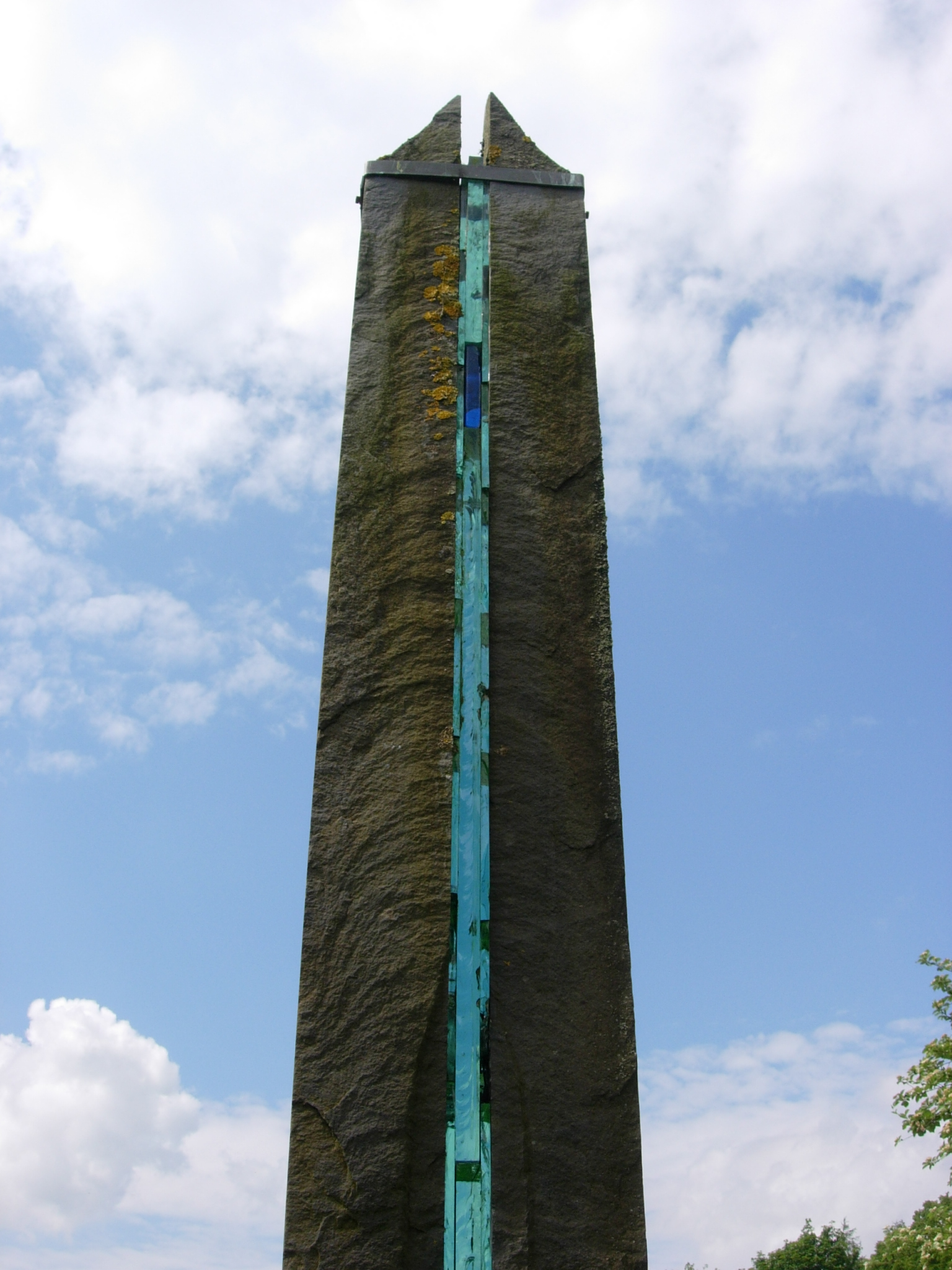
Light Column by Charles Grey Bray

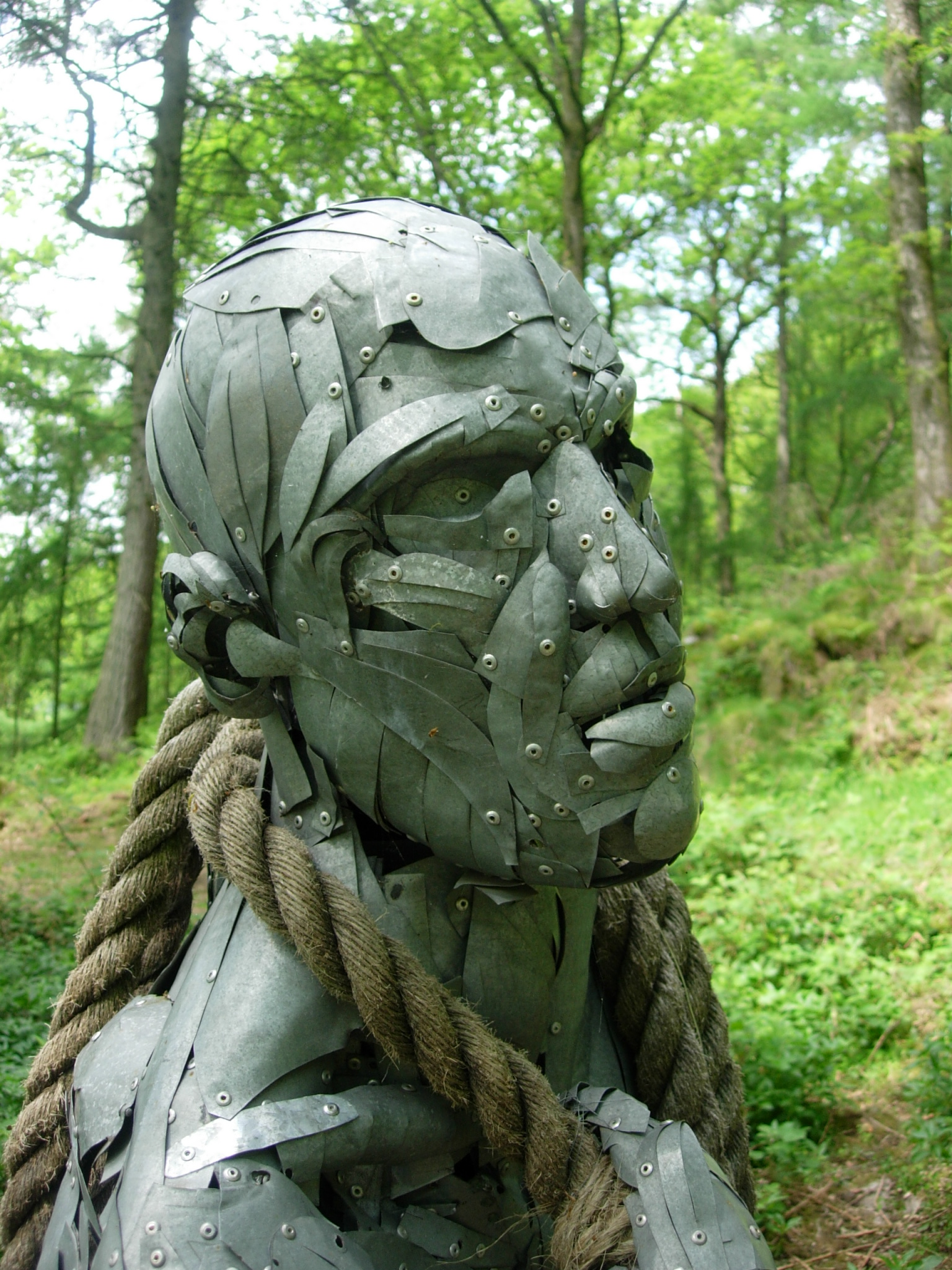
Detail from Mea Culpa by Robert Bryce Muir, 2006

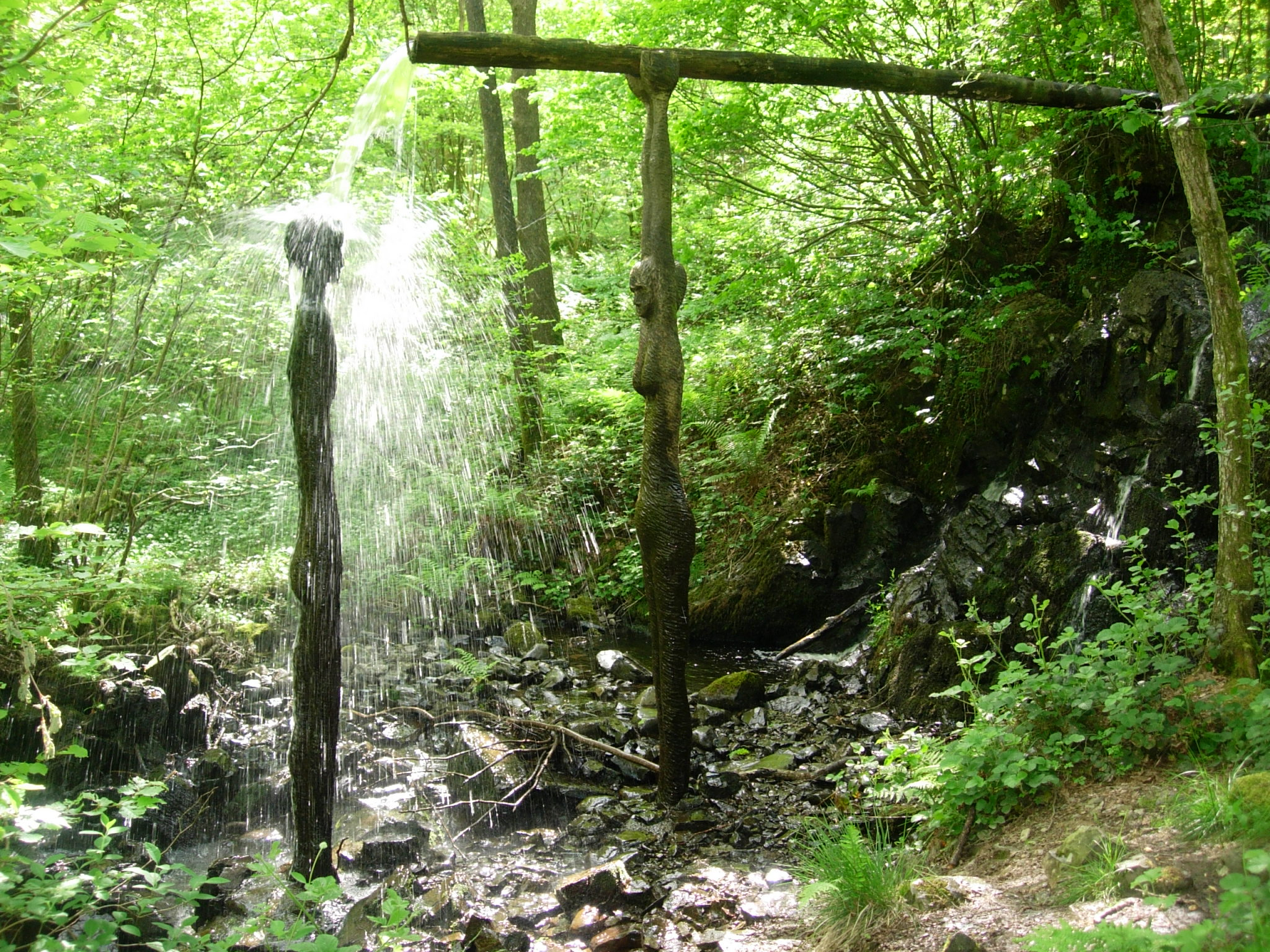
Lady of the Water

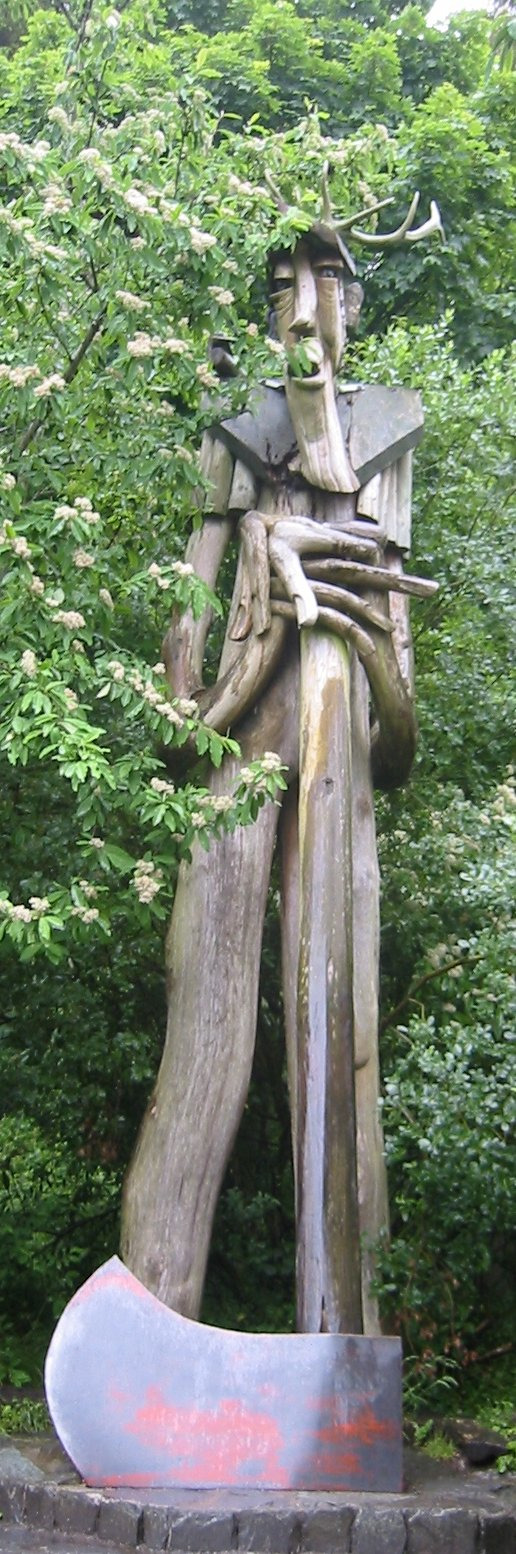
Woodsman sculpture from Grizedale visitor centre by David Kemp (sculptor)

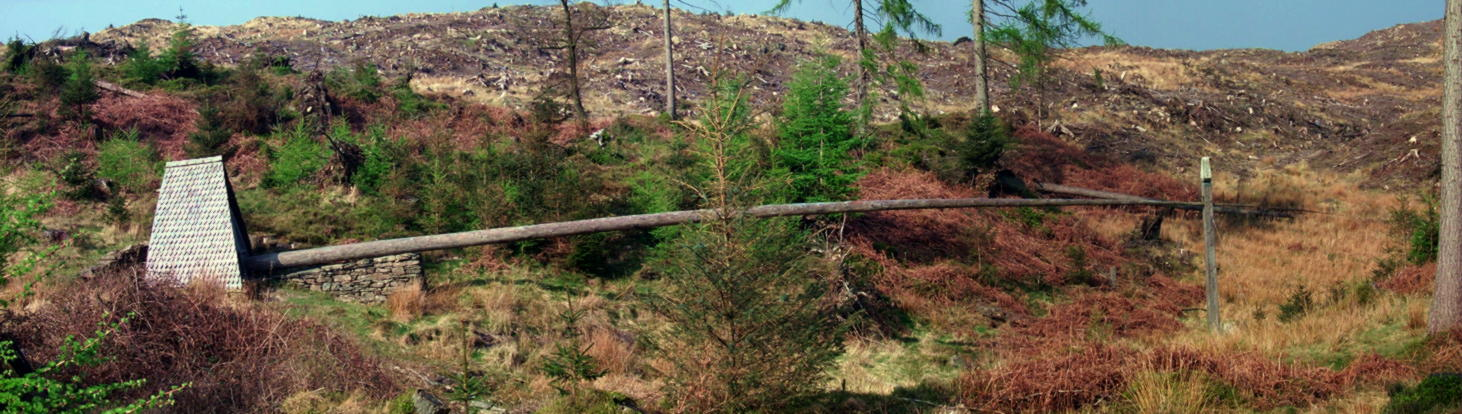
Panorama of a sculpture

== See also ==
- Grizedale College, a constituent college of the University of Lancaster named after the forest
