= Robert Koenig (sculptor) =

English sculptor

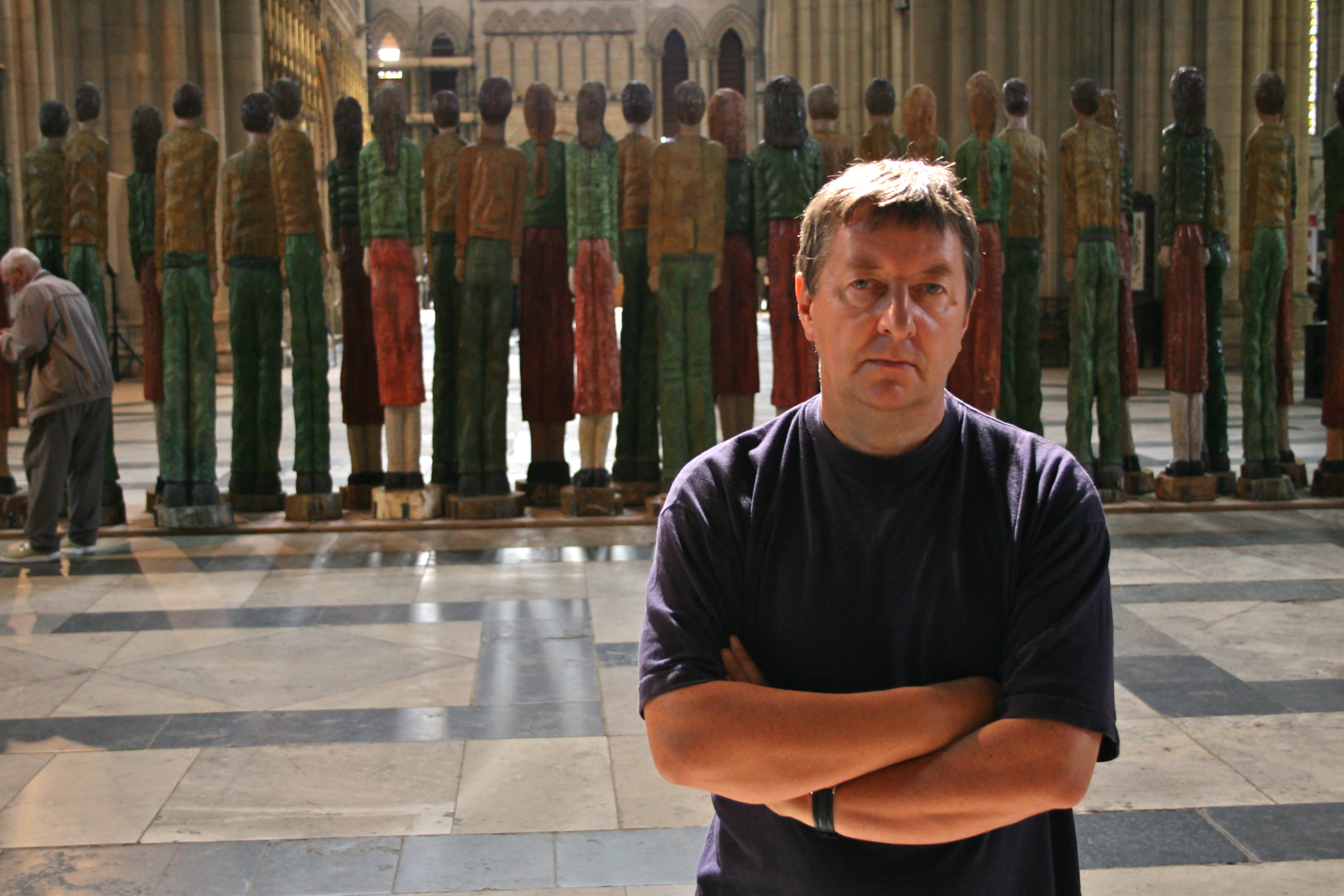
- Koenig with Odyssey in York Minster 2008
- Born: 1951; Manchester, England
- Died: 14 November 2023 (aged 71–72)
- Resting place: Hove Cemetery, Hove, England
- Education: Brighton Polytechnic; Slade School of Art; Krakow Academy of Fine Arts
- Known for: Sculpture
- Style: Woodcarving

Robert Koenig (1951 – 14 November 2023) was an English sculptor based in Sussex, who specialised in wood sculpture and was a prominent exponent of the art of woodcarving using the traditional tools of mallet and chisel. He was known for his carved and polychromed figurative wood sculptures, which he had been creating since the early 1980s. One of the earliest polychromed figures was shown in the 'Temple' exhibition at the Shaw Theatre, London in 1988.

== Early life ==
Koenig was born in Manchester of Polish immigrants. He made his first carving as a pupil at the Polish Seminary School, 5 Rue des Irlandais, Paris from 1963 to 1970. He witnessed the student rioters burning cars outside the school in the student riots in Paris in 1968, and remembers playing volleyball with Cardinal Wojtyla of Krakow, the later Pope John Paul II who was a frequent visitor to the Seminary. The building is now the Irish Cultural Centre and was previously the Irish College in Paris. He graduated from Brighton Polytechnic with First Class Honours in Fine Art in 1976. In 1978 he obtained a Higher Diploma of Postgraduate Sculpture at the prestigious Slade School of Fine Art, London; he was a contemporary of Antony Gormley, as both studied in the Slade Sculpture Department at the same time 1977 to 1978. He won the Boise Travel Bursary in 1978, and in 1983 a scholarship to the Krakow Academy of Fine Arts, Poland.

== Work ==
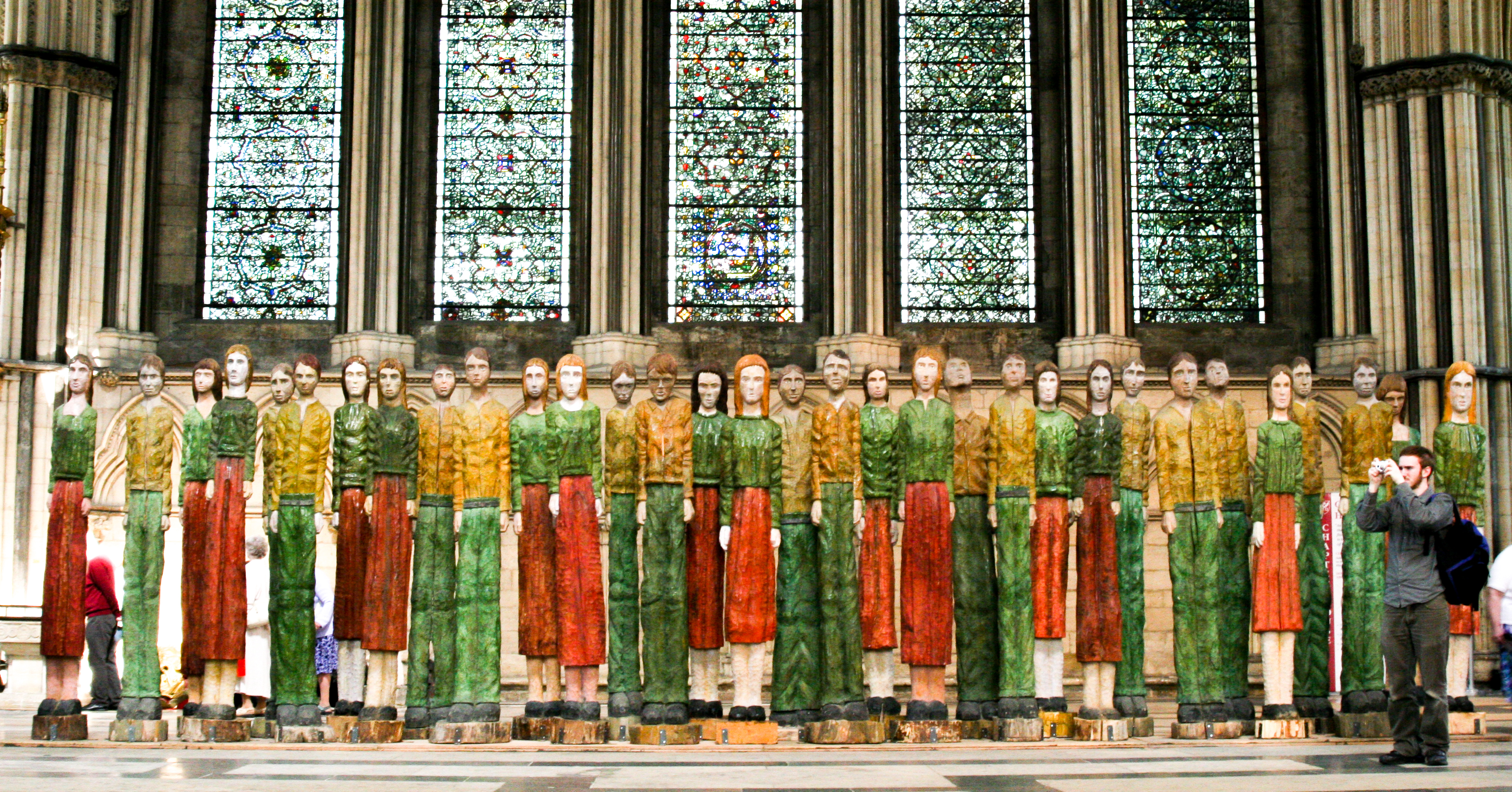
Odyssey Sculptures in York Minster, UK 2008

Koenig was noted for his imaginative and bold use of colour on wood, which started during his Slade student days. He produced woodcarvings both large and small for public and private spaces around the UK. 'Metropolis', a 34 ft oak column, was sited in Campbell Park in Central Milton Keynes in 1991. 'Bilston Totems' is a group of 15 carved sweet chestnut trees up to 19 ft in height and sited on the Oxford Road roundabout in Bilston, Wolverhampton in 1997.

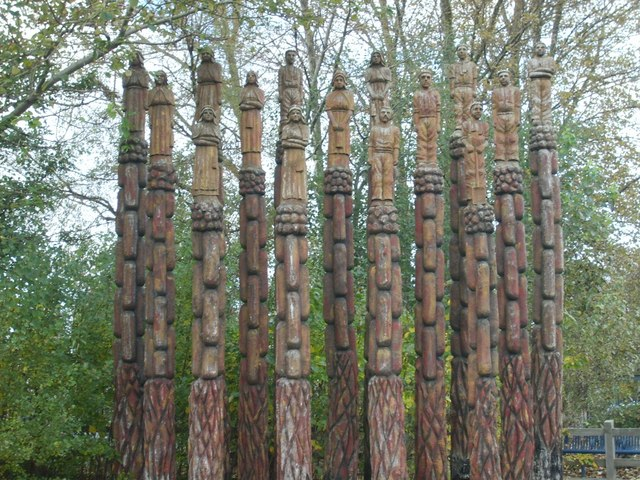
Bilston Totem - geograph.org.uk - 610558

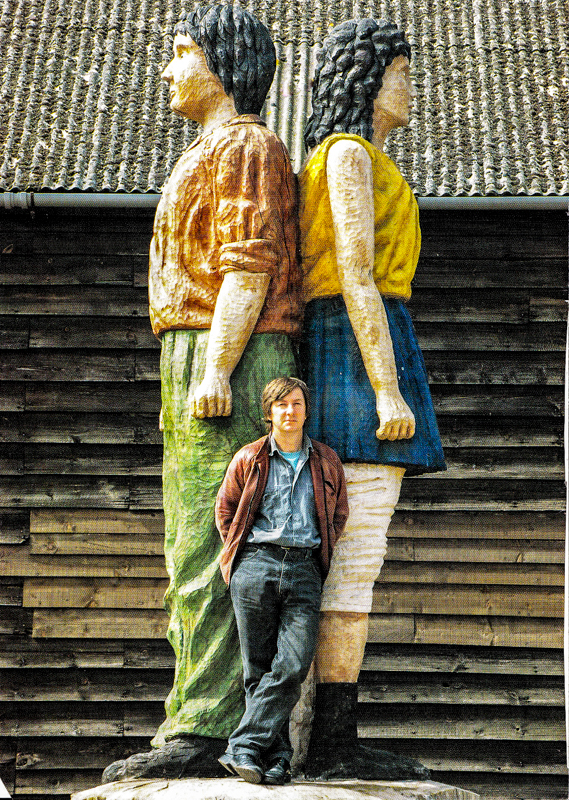
14 ft cedar woodcarving sited on Kents Hill roundabout Milton Keynes 1997 with sculptor Robert Koenig

A 14ft cedar woodcarving titled Boy and Girl sat on a roundabout in Kents Hill, Milton Keynes in 1997. Koening regularly worked on large scale carved and painted wood relief panels such as the 'Blue Portal no. 7' purchased by the Buckinghamshire County Museum in Aylesbury in 1997 and the smaller 'Rustic Umbrellas' purchased by the Arts Council of Great Britain. He was one of the first artists to be invited to participate in the Grizedale Forest Sculpture Project in the Lake District of England. He spent seven months during 1982–83 living and working in a forest environment and left behind six sculptures as his personal response to this landscape. The Grizedale Forest Sculpture Project was initiated in 1977 and has influenced a generation of sculptors and helped transform the way sculpture is seen and made and understood in public places.

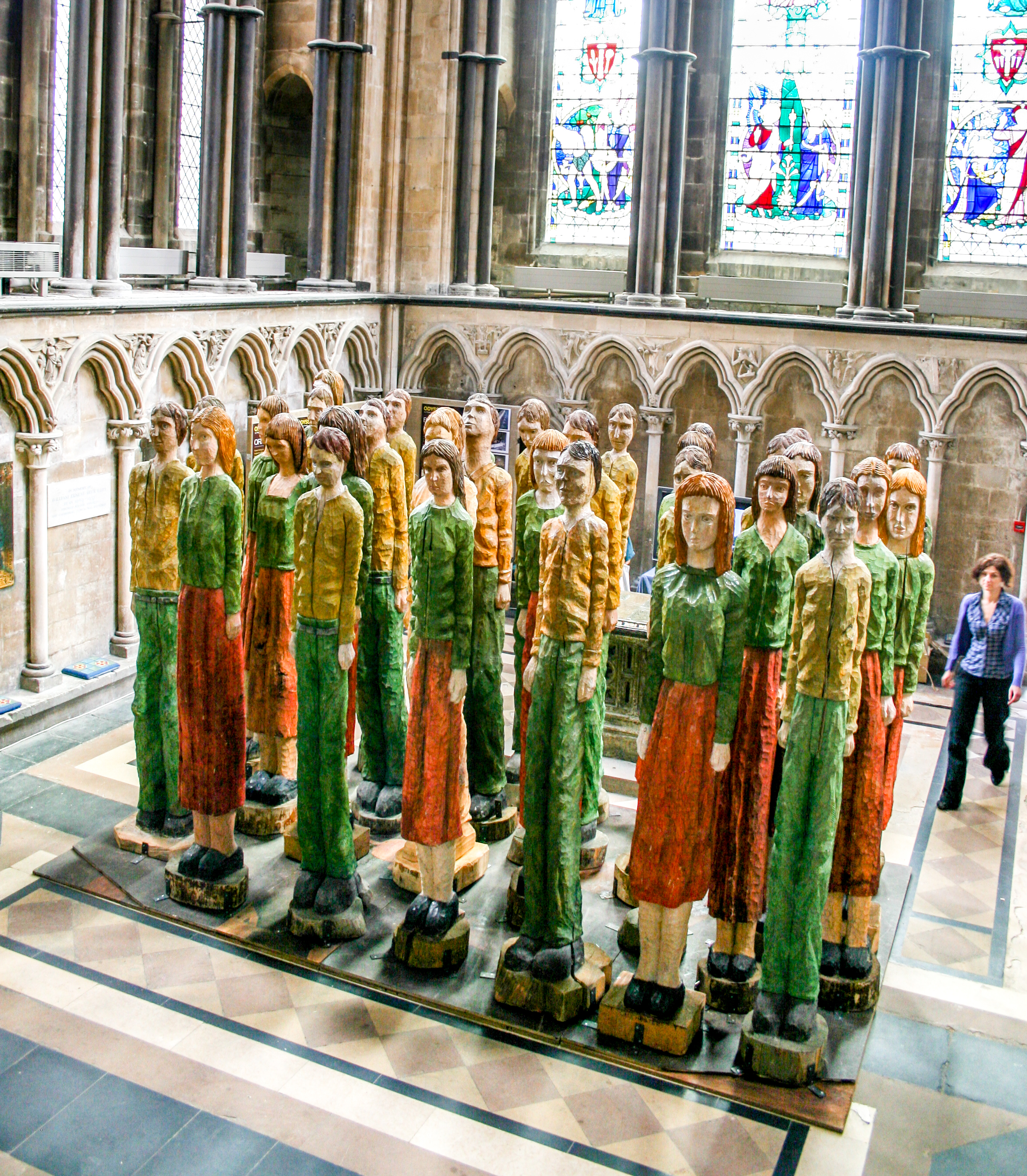
A group of 33 carved wood figures, each 2.5m tall, created by the sculptor Robert Koenig and exhibited in Worcester Cathedral, UK in 2009

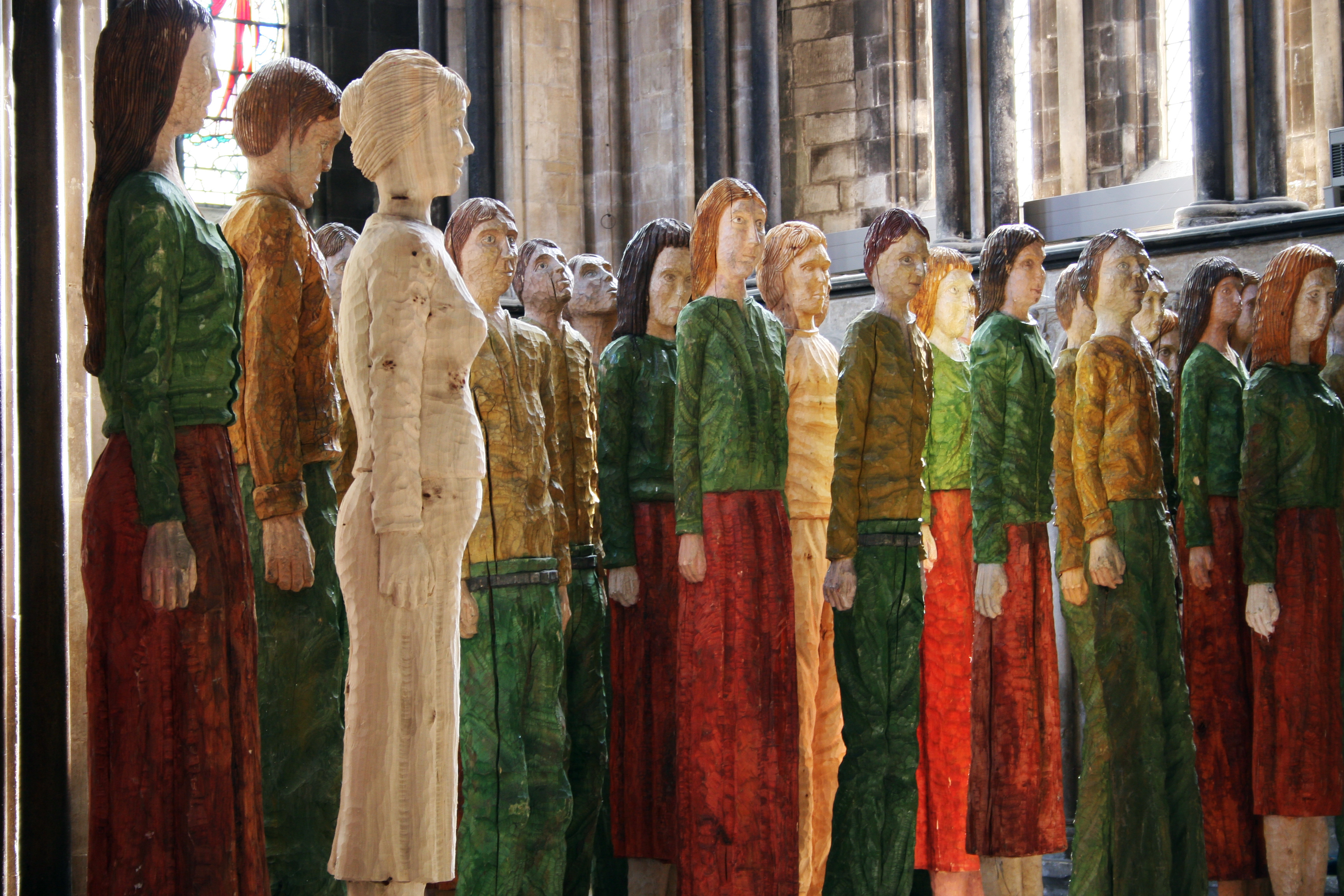
Odyssey crowd, Worcester Cathedral, August 2009

His monumental woodcarving project 'Odyssey' sought out temporary exhibition spaces in cathedrals, street corners, town squares, barns and fields in Poland, Ukraine and the UK in venues such as Rochester Cathedral, Portsmouth Cathedral, Salisbury Cathedral, Chichester Cathedral, Worcester Cathedral and York Minster. Odyssey consisted of an expanding group of carved wood male and female figures, each 2.5m tall. These polychromed figures were exhibited in Leutkirch im Allgäu, Baden-Württemberg, Germany in 2013. As of 2019, there were 46 figures in the Odyssey touring group. A further 5 Odyssey figures were created for each of the five exhibition venues in Germany between 2013-17.

From 1996, Koenig collaborated closely with the Museum Dwory Karwacjanow and Gladyszow in the town of Gorlice in South East Poland. He held exhibitions there in 1997, 2001 and 2004 and in the nearby town of Tarnow in 1998 and 2004. He was a regular Polish–English translator of their art catalogues and associated texts and information boards. He also helped set up art workshops and symposiums for UK participants at the restored Renaissance castle of Szymbark.

Work in public and private collections in United Kingdom, USA, France, Italy, Malta, Sweden, Germany, Greece, China and Poland.

== Projects ==
=== Dziady – In search of Jan Dudek ===
Growing up in the suburbs of Manchester, Koenig heard tales of his mother's childhood in south-east Poland, full of community and characters, superseded as he grew older by the altogether darker narrative of her wartime removal to Germany, the hell of the labour camps and her eventual arrival in the UK. For Koenig, the stories stuck, creating a desire to learn more, to see the country of his ancestors and to come to terms with his family history. As a young man in the 1970s, he endured lengthy coach rides and the privations of communist Poland to rebuild the bond with his greater family. As his knowledge of that country grew, so did his realisation that he was shaped more deeply by his past: a sculpting contemporary of Anthony Gormley at London's prestigious Slade School of Art, Koenig suffered for his instinctive – and unfashionable – decision to work in wood, a form which he was now to appreciate as a distinctly Polish tradition. As he matured, Koenig sought his defining project and so in 1997 began carving a series of greater-than-life-size figures, initially called "Dziady", the Polish name of a ceremony celebrating the memory of deceased ancestors, but since renamed "Odyssey" for what has become an international audience. A mass of figures to represent the ancestors he never met, they are "monumental", although rather than crying out for attention, they appeal to the viewer on a more intimate, empathetic level, often inspiring strong emotions from those who come into contact with them. A film of Robert Koenig's tour to the Ukraine – Dziady: In Search of Jan Dudek – will be released soon. (Jan Dudek is Robert Koenig's sculptor uncle who died in 1929 in Przemyslany, Poland – now a part of Western Ukraine).

=== Odyssey ===
'Odyssey' finally arrived in the UK in 2006 and was honoured by the Brighton Festival Fringe in that year. At the sculptor's request they are currently touring unconventional venues – including a series of churches and cathedrals – in the UK, reaching out to 'ordinary' people rather than being cosseted in a gallery. Koenig has always looked for new ways to display his work and the Odyssey tour also majors heavily on music, encouraging local players to engage in a 'conversation' with the work. In the film showing here, saxophonist Tony Rose provides an improvisation inspired by the figures (including the introductory music in the piece) and acclaimed multi-instrumentalist Phil Thornton is seen interacting with the figures during their Brighton stay.

A major showing of the monumental Odyssey project consisting of 40 figures each 2.5 metres (8 ft 2 in) tall took place at St Martin-in-the-Fields, Trafalgar Square, London from 19 March to 20 July 2012. Later, the project travelled to Germany (Leutkirch im Allgäu 2013, Memmingen 2014, and Weingarten 2015).

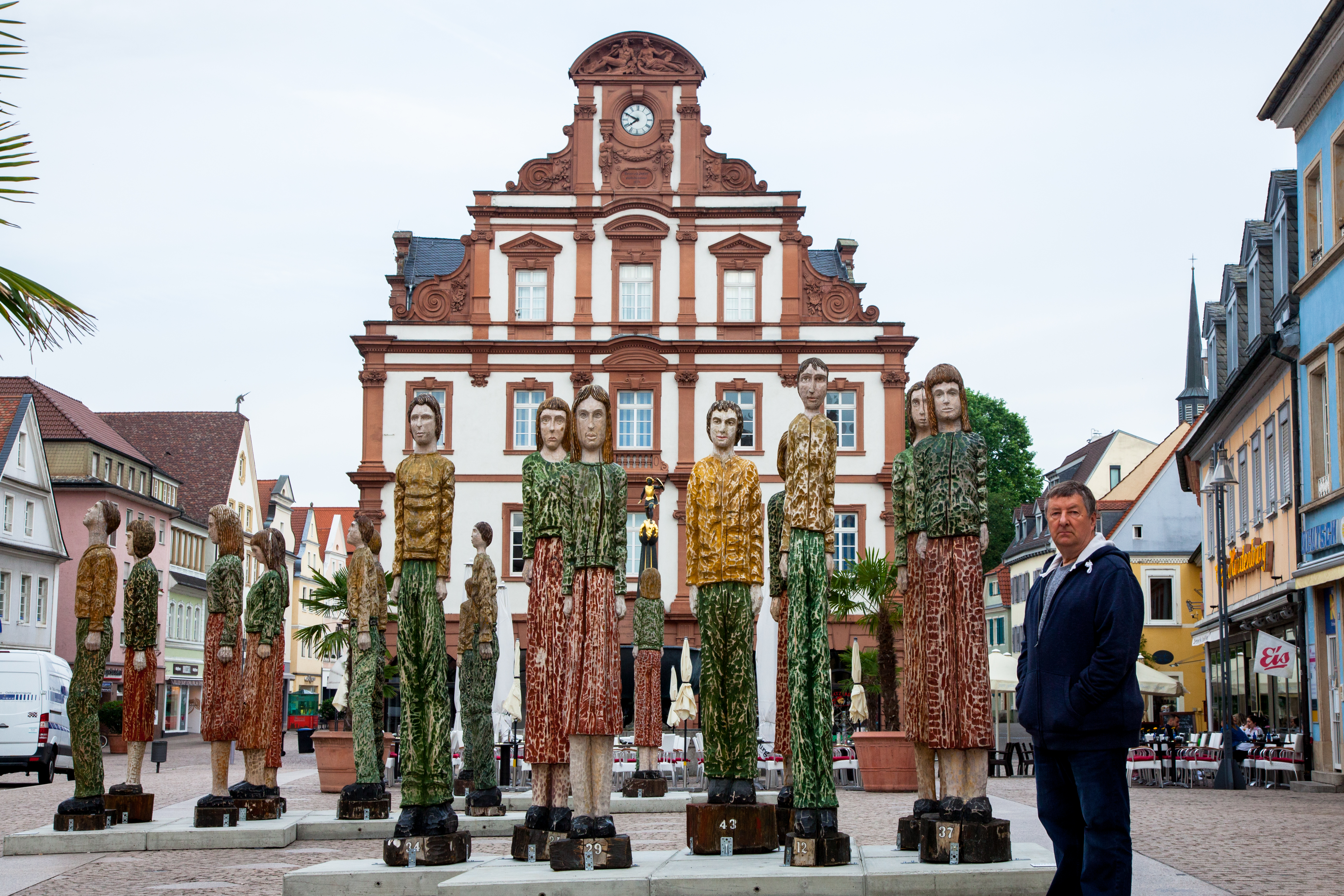
Odyssey figures on the Maximilianstrasse in Speyer, Germany with sculptor Robert Koenig 2017

The Speyer Town Council in Germany invited Robert Koenig to exhibit his ‘Odyssey’ project in the town in 2017 to help commemorate the 500th anniversary of the Reformation. It was also to mark the 75th anniversary of the year when the artist’s mother was brought to the town as a forced worker from her home in Poland. It was also the 20th anniversary of the Odyssey tour across Europe (1997–2017).

== Reviews ==
The foreword to the catalogue of Koenig's retrospective exhibition 1982–2002 at the Cadzow Gallery, Chatelherault, Hamilton, Scotland, was written by distinguished Polish artist and rector of the Academy of Fine Arts in Krakow, Poland, Prof. Włodzimierz Kunz.

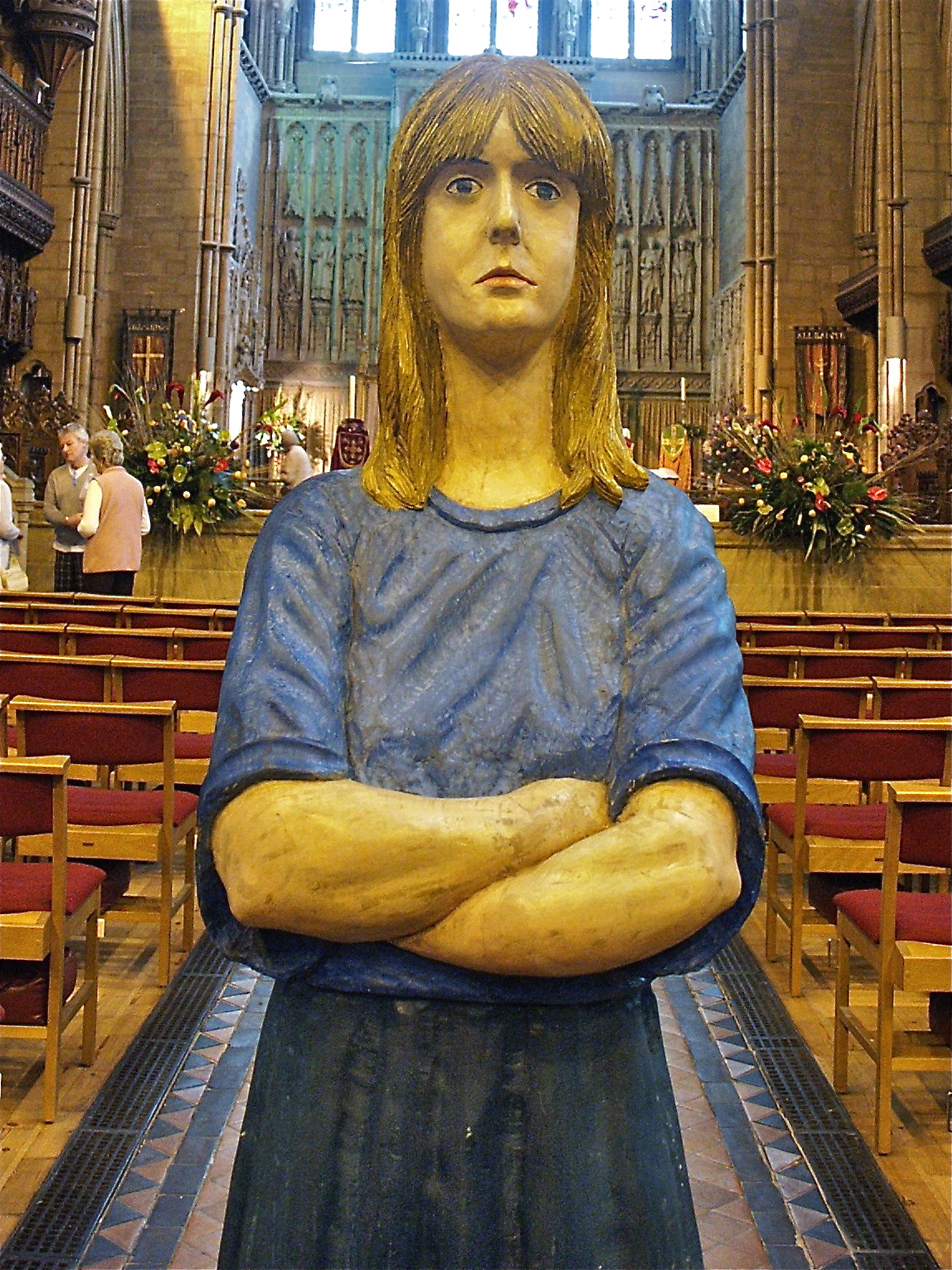
Figure in green skirt, lifesize polychromed limewood, exhibited at All Saints Church, Hove during Brighton Arts Festival May 2006 by sculptor Robert Koenig

In 1992, the artist Craigie Horsfield wrote: "Koenig drew from the culture of carving that was rooted in the folk art of Central Europe; a naturalist depiction of the world with mythic overtones. It is no coincidence that the small renaissance of wood carving apparent in Europe should have happened in Germany; in our century the focus of the long struggle of nationalism and mystery. It was given impetus and found acceptance through the painted wood sculpture of Georg Baselitz. In the line of Kirchner's expressionist figures the wood is scarred and the heads, excessive and gestural, have pigment dragged across them. They came out of the expressionist tradition but made space effectively for other artists to be seen. The most visible of these has been Stefan Balkenhol, an artist making naturalistic painted figures acknowledging a tradition of Central European village carving. It is against this background that Robert Koenig works." (from the catalogue "Robert Koenig sculpture")

Koenig is the creator of "Odyssey," a traveling project focused on themes of migration and displacement. The project, which utilizes traditional woodcarving techniques, has been exhibited in several locations including Kraków, Zakopane, Tarnów, and Lviv. The first exhibition of the Odyssey project took place at the Dwór Karwacjanów Museum and Art Gallery in Gorlice, Poland, in 1997.

Reinhold Gall, Baden-Wuerttemberg, Minister of the Interior, Germany, “The ‘Odyssey’ sculptures are ‘social sculptures’ - in order to strive for the extended art concept of the German artist Joseph Beuys. Beuys also understood modern art as a ‘shaping of the social whole’ and a ‘moving of ideas’. The sculpture concept ‘Odyssey’ also stands for movement, both for the dark sides of migration, displacement, expulsion, loss and humiliation of people, as well as for the hopeful side of movement and change. His art expresses the dignity and moves this idea with the help of people. Odyssey provides the impetus for a modern way of remembrance that contributes to the struggle and the common."

Reinhold Gall was the guest of honour at the opening of the ‘Odyssey’ exhibition in Leutkirch im Allgau in 2013 where he gave the above speech.

== Death ==
Due to suddenly declining physical health from glioblastoma as ordered by his doctor, Koening officially retired from woodcarving in August 2023 and left his work available at his studio in South Chailey. He died on 14 November 2023 and is survived by his wife Regina and sons. His requiem mass took place on 6 December at St Peter's Catholic Church in Hove.

== Solo exhibitions ==
- 1977 Polish Cultural Institute, London
- 1982 London Wood Partners Gallery, London
- 1983 Greenwich Theatre Gallery, London
- 1986 The Great Barn, Milton Keynes
- 1987 Leicester Royal Infirmary, Leicester
- 1988 Shaw Theatre, London
- 1992 Rufford Country Park, Notts., 'Temple & Portals', Milton Keynes Exhibition Gallery. 'Out of the Greenwood', Oxfordshire County Museum, Woodstock. 'Temple & Portals', Middlesbrough Art Gallery.
- 1993 RIBA Sculpture Court, London
- 1994 'Carmen and Other Stories', High Wycombe Museum
- 1996 Apsidal Gallery, Rufford Country Park, Notts
- 1997 'At the Edge of Centuries', Bucks County Museum, Aylesbury. Dwor Karwacjanów Gallery, Gorlice, Poland.
- 1998 'Dziady' Galeria Pasaz, Tarnow, Poland. 'At the Edge of Centuries' Leighton Buzzard Library Gallery, Bedford Library Gallery, Dunstable Library Gallery.
- 1999 Horsham Arts Centre
- 2001 'Relics of Memory', East Kilbride Arts Centre
- 2002 20-year Retrospective Exhibition, Cadzow Gallery, Hamilton, Scotland
- 2003 Otter Gallery, University College, Chichester
- 2004 'Galician Odyssey' – 'Dziady' project on tour: Palace of Art, Lwow, Ukraine. ‘Art on a European Street', Tarnow, Poland. Gallery Strug, Zakopane, Poland. Museum of Archeology, Krakow, Poland. Space Gallery, Krakow, Poland. Dwor Karwacjanow Gallery, Gorlice, Poland.
- 2006 Odyssey, Brighton Fringe Arts Festival, All Saints Church, (Prizewinner)
- 2007 Odyssey on tour: Chichester Cathedral, Portsmouth Cathedral, Church of Christ the Cornerstone, Milton Keynes, Rochester Cathedral, Stockport Museum and Art Gallery, Chadkirk Chapel Romiley Cheshire, Museum of Hatting Stockport.
- 2008 Odyssey on tour: Salisbury Cathedral, Polish Art, Brighton Fringe Festival, York Minster, St Joseph's Church, Cwmaman, South Wales. Arundel Cathedral, Sussex. North Gallery, Hailsham.
- 2009 Odyssey on tour: St. Helier, Jersey. Worcester Cathedral

‘The Culture of Wood' Gibberd Gallery, Harlow (retrospective)

- 2012 Odyssey St Martin in the Field, Trafalgar Square, London
- 2012 Odyssey Bow Methodist Church, London
- 2012 Odyssey Hull University
- 2012 Culture of Wood, Pall Mall, London
- 2013 Odyssey Leutkirch im Allgäu, Southern Germany
- 2013 Lamm3 Gallery, Leutkirch im Allgäu, Germany
- 2014 Odyssey Memmingen Festival, Bavaria, Germany
- 2015 Odyssey Weingarten, Germany
- 2015 Odyssey Nürtingen, Germany
- 2015 ‘Memorial Structure’, 20-21 Arts Centre, Scunthorpe, UK
- 2016 ‘Memorial Structure’, Grimsby Minster, UK
- 2017 Odyssey Speyer, Germany
- 2018 Ripley Arts Centre, Bromley, London
- 2018 OXO Tower Wharf Gallery, South Bank, London
- 2019 ‘Memorial Structure’ Worthing Museum and Art Gallery, UK

== Publications ==
- Open Air Sculpture in Britain – Zwemmer/Tate Gallery, ISBN 0-302-02749-1
- A Sense of Place – Sculpture in Landscape – Coelfrith Press, ISBN 0-904461-85-8
- The Grizedale Experience – Canongate Press, 1991, ISBN 0-86241-354-0
- Art in Public – AN Publications, ISBN 0-907730-18-3
- The Encyclopaedia of Sculpting Techniques – John Plowman, Quarto Books, ISBN 0-7472-1278-3
- Start Sculpting – John Plowman, Quarto Books, ISBN 1-85348-960-3
- Natural Order – The Grizedale Society, 1996, ISBN 0-9525450-5-5
- The Art of the Woodcarver – GMC Publications, ISBN 1-86108-011-5
- At The Edge of Centuries – catalogue – essay by Craigie Horsfield −1997
- Dziady – catalogue – essay by Jerzy Madeyski, 1997, ISBN 83-904836-6-1
- Robert Koenig – Sculpture – catalogue – 2002
