= Autodesk Mudbox =

3D sculpting and painting tool

- Original author: Skymatter Ltd.
- Developer: Autodesk
- Stable release: 2024 / April 11, 2023; 3 years ago
- Operating system: Windows, macOS, Linux
- Platform: x86-64
- Type: 3D computer graphics
- License: Proprietary
- Website: autodesk.com/mudbox

Mudbox is a proprietary computer-based 3D sculpting and painting tool. Currently developed by Autodesk, Mudbox was created by Skymatter, founded by Tibor Madjar, David Cardwell and Andrew Camenisch, former artists of Weta Digital, where the tool was first used to produce the 2005 Peter Jackson remake of King Kong. Mudbox's primary application is high-resolution digital sculpting, texture painting, displacement map creation, and normal map creation, although it is also used as a design tool.

== History ==
Mudbox was developed by Skymatter in New Zealand as the founders David Cardwell, Tibor Madjar and Andrew Camenisch were working on The Lord of the Rings at Weta Digital circa 2001. They created the software to expand their own toolsets, and Mudbox was first used as a complete product in the 2005 film King Kong. The beta was released in May 2006, followed by version 1.0 in mid-February 2007. On August 6, 2007, Autodesk announced the acquisition of Skymatter. Since 2020, no new features or bugfixes have been implemented except for new installers. However, there are still new releases yearly. In August 2026, Autodesk announced that Mudbox will be discontinued due to a lack of significant enhancements since 2019.

== Features ==
Mudbox's user interface is a 3D environment that allows the creation of movable cameras that can be bookmarked. Models created within the program typically start as a polygon mesh that can be manipulated with a variety of different tools. A model can be subdivided to increase its resolution and the number of polygons available to sculpt with. 3D layers allow the user to store different detail passes, blending them with multiplier sliders and layer masks. Using layers, the user is able to sculpt and mold their 3D model without making permanent changes.

As a detailing app, Mudbox can import and export .obj, .fbx, and .bio files, as well as its own .mud format. A typical workflow is to create a relatively simple (low polygon count) model in a 3D modeling application and then import it to Mudbox for sculpting. Subdivision of models occurs using the Catmull-Clark subdivision algorithm.

The sculpting tool set contains an assortment of brushes with adjustable falloffs.

The use of 3D layers allows for design visualization, non-destructive sculpting, and high polygon counts. Since the layers combine additively, their ordering is unimportant for the final model and may be created arbitrarily. Curves can be created and projected on a mesh for use as precise masking. Standard transform and selection tools are included. Paint layers were added in Mudbox 2009.

Design visualization plays an important role in Mudbox's production value. Simple poly primitives can be created from within Mudbox, facilitating the creation of busts, props, terrain, etc.

Mudbox also includes stamps and stencils. Stencils work by overlaying a grayscale, or "alpha channel" image, such as a bump map, over the mesh. The artist can then project part or all of the image's detail onto the mesh through brush strokes, providing a method to quickly sculpt surface detail.

The underlying architecture of Mudbox was updated in Mudbox 2009, to allow the sculpting of models with larger polygon counts compared to earlier versions. In Mudbox 2009, 3D painting and texturing features were introduced to allow artists to paint directly on their models in 3D. In addition, features to display the model with a depth of field and ambient occlusion were added for the release.

In Mudbox 2010, an application programming interface (API) was introduced via a software development kit (SDK). In addition, functionality to improve file interoperability with other 3D applications (Autodesk Maya, 3ds Max etc.) was added via the FBX file format.

== Interface ==
Mudbox's interface includes menus, tabbed windows, tool trays, keyboard shortcuts, and can be customized to a limited extent. The navigation in the 3D view is similar to that of Autodesk Maya.

== Awards ==
On February 15, 2014, Canadians Andrew Camenisch, David Cardwell and Canadian-Hungarian Tibor Madjar were honored by the Academy of Motion Picture Arts and Sciences with an Academy Award for Technical Achievement for scientific and technical achievement on the concept and design, along with Csaba Kőhegyi and Imre Major, two Hungarians educated at Debrecen University, for implementation of the Mudbox software.

== See also ==
- Blender
- ZBrush
