= 3D-Coat =

Digital sculpting program

3DCoat
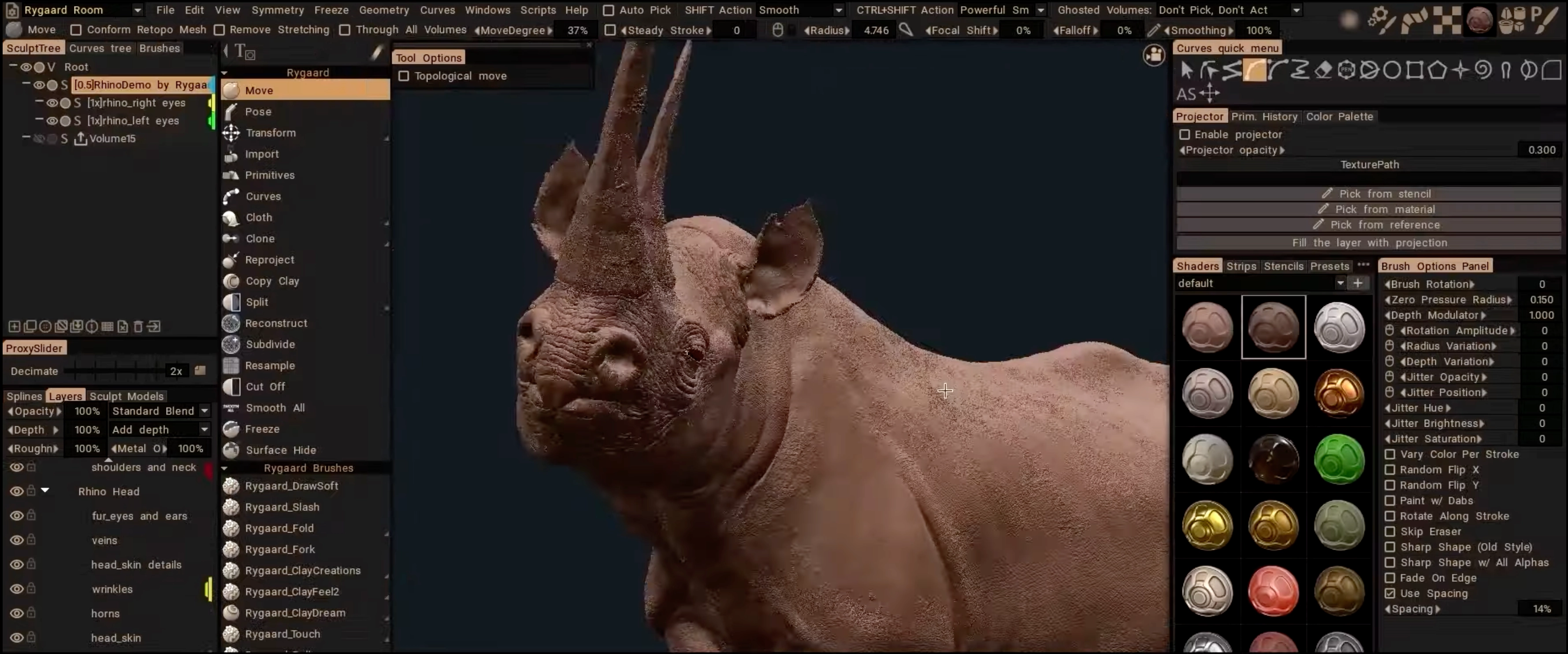
- Screenshot of 3DCoat
- Developer: Pilgway
- Stable release: 2026.11 / July 22, 2026; 2 months ago
- Operating system: Windows, Mac OS X, Linux
- Type: 3D computer graphics
- License: Trialware
- Website: 3dcoat.com

3DCoat is a commercial digital sculpting program from Pilgway designed to create free-form organic and hard surfaced 3D models, with tools which enable users to sculpt, add polygonal topology (automatically or manually), create UV maps (automatically or manually), texture the resulting models with natural painting tools, and render static images or animated "turntable" movies.

The program can also be used to modify imported 3D models from a number of commercial 3D software products by means of plugins called Applinks. Imported models can be converted into voxel objects for further refinement and for adding high resolution detail, complete UV unwrapping and mapping, as well as adding PBR textures for displacement, bump maps, specular and diffuse color maps. A live connection to a chosen external 3D application can be established through the Applink pipeline, allowing for the transfer of model and texture information.

3DCoat specializes in voxel sculpting and polygonal sculpting using dynamic patch tessellation technology and polygonal sculpting tools. It includes "auto-retopology", a proprietary skinning algorithm which generates a polygonal mesh skin over any voxel sculpture, composed primarily of quadrangles.
