= Digital sculpting =

Use of software to manipulate a digital object

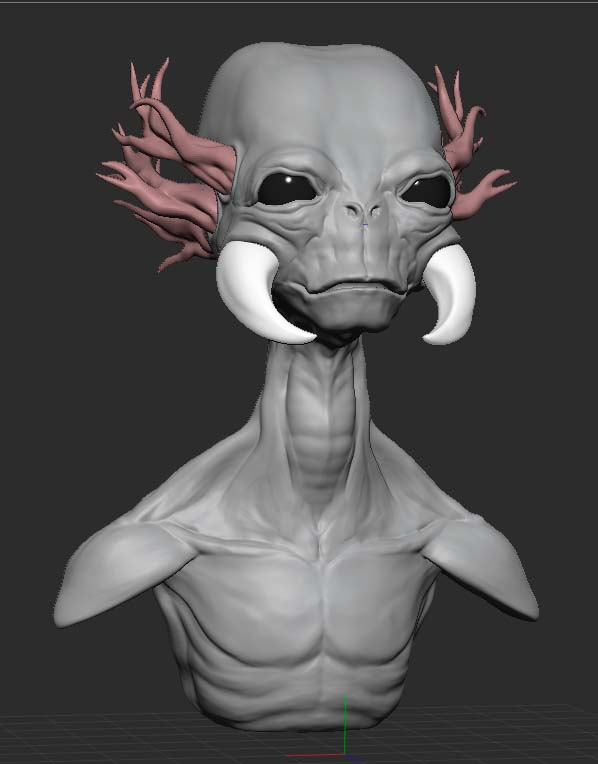
A digital model made with ZBrush

Digital sculpting, also known as sculpt modeling or 3D sculpting, is the use of software that offers tools to push, pull, smooth, grab, pinch or otherwise manipulate a digital object as if it were made of a real-life substance such as clay.

== Sculpting technology ==
The geometry used in digital sculpting programs to represent the model can vary; each offers different benefits and limitations. The majority of digital sculpting tools on the market use mesh-based geometry, in which an object is represented by an interconnected surface mesh of polygons that can be pushed and pulled around. This is somewhat similar to the physical process of beating copper plates to sculpt a scene in relief. Other digital sculpting tools use voxel-based geometry, in which the volume of the object is the basic element. Material can be added and removed, much like sculpting in clay. Still other tools make use of more than one basic geometry representation.

A benefit of mesh-based programs is that they support sculpting at multiple resolutions on a single model. Areas of the model that are finely detailed can have very small polygons while other areas can have larger polygons. In many mesh-based programs, the mesh can be edited at different levels of detail, and the changes at one level will propagate to higher and lower levels of model detail. A limitation of mesh-based sculpting is the fixed topology of the mesh; the specific arrangement of the polygons can limit the ways in which detail can be added or manipulated.

A benefit of voxel-based sculpting is that voxels allow complete freedom over form. The topology of a model can be altered continually during the sculpting process as material is added and subtracted, which frees the sculptor from considering the layout of polygons on the model's surface. After sculpting, it may be necessary to retopologize the model to obtain a clean mesh for use in animation or real-time rendering. Voxels, however, are more limited in handling multiple levels of detail. Unlike mesh-based modeling, broad changes made to voxels at a low level of detail may completely destroy finer details.

== Uses ==
Sculpting can often introduce details to meshes that would otherwise have been difficult or impossible to create using traditional 3D modeling techniques. This makes it preferable for achieving photorealistic and hyperrealistic results, though, many stylized results are achieved as well.

Sculpting is primarily used in high poly organic modeling (the creation of 3D models which consist mainly of curves or irregular surfaces, as opposed to hard surface modeling). It is also used by auto manufacturers in their design of new cars.

It can create the source meshes for low poly game models used in video games. In conjunction with other 3D modeling and texturing techniques and Displacement and Normal mapping, it can greatly enhance the appearance of game meshes often to the point of photorealism. Some sculpting programs like 3D-Coat, Zbrush, and Mudbox offer ways to integrate their workflows with traditional 3D modeling and rendering programs. Conversely, 3D modeling applications like 3ds Max, Maya and MODO are now incorporating sculpting capability as well, though these are usually less advanced than tools found in sculpting-specific applications.

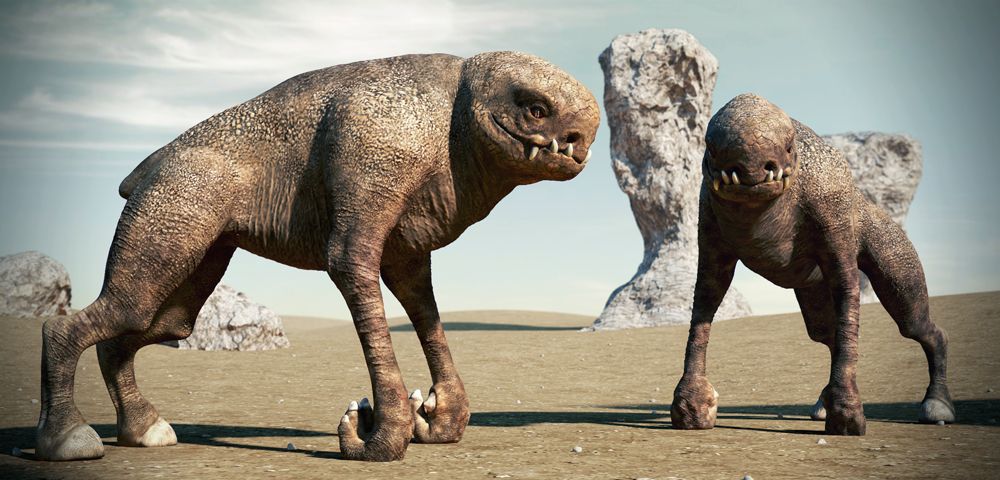
This rendering of two alien creatures shows the amount of photorealism achievable through digital sculpting in conjunction with other modeling, texturing, and rendering techniques.

High poly sculpts are also extensively used in CG artwork for movies, industrial design, art, photorealistic illustrations, and for prototyping in 3D printing.

== 3D print ==
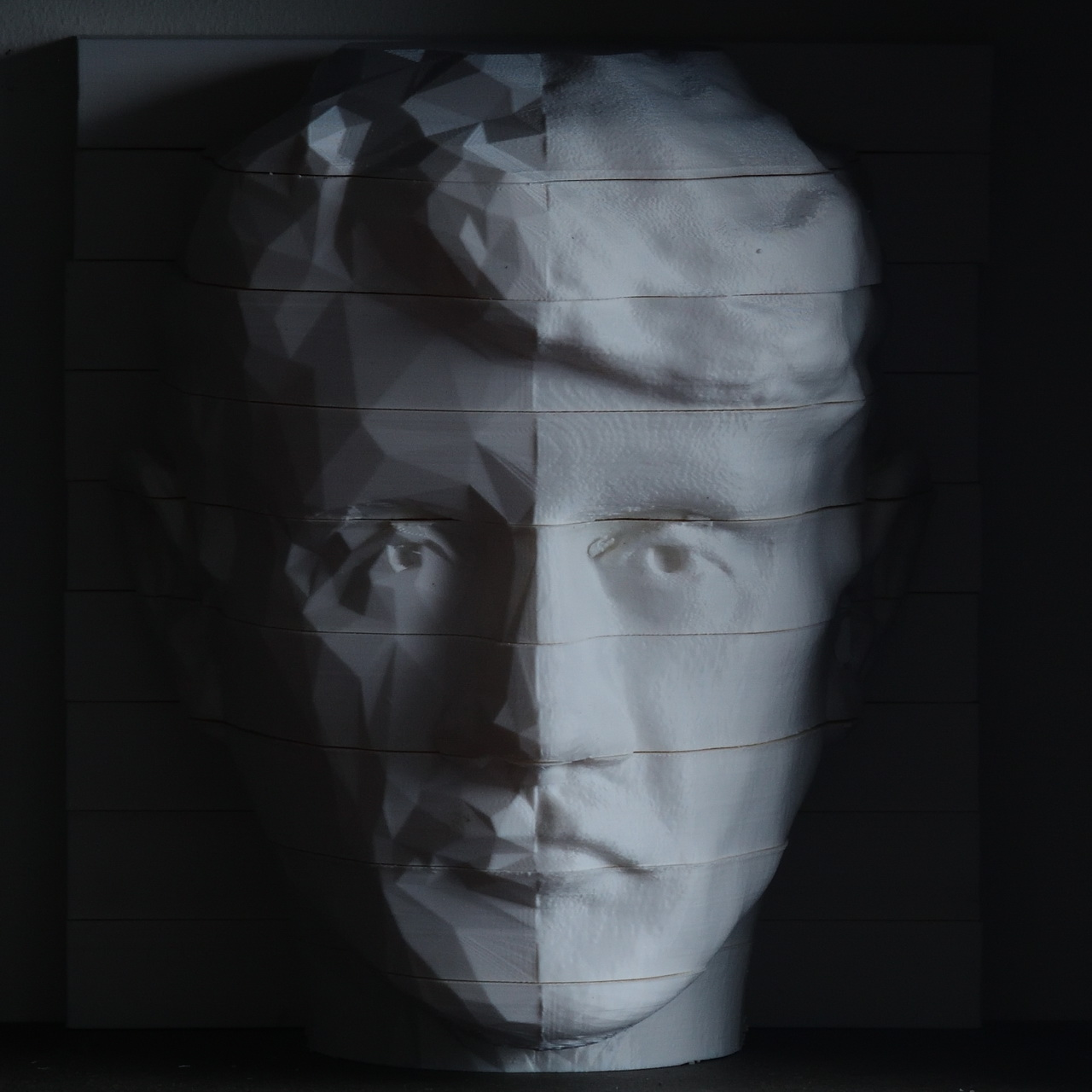
3D printed Digital sculpture by Digital Artist Ivo Meier

Sculptors and digital artists use digital sculpting to create a model (or Digital Twin) to be materialized through CNC technologies including 3D printing. The final sculptures are often called Digital Sculpture or 3D printed art. While digital technologies have emerged in many art disciplines (painting, photography), this is less the case for digital sculpture due to the higher complexity and technology limitations to produce the final sculpture.

== Sculpting Process ==
The best way to learn sculpture is by understanding primary, secondary and tertiary forms. First, break down the object you want to make down its basic shapes, such as a sphere or cube. Focus on making the large, overall shape of the object. After that, work on the bigger shapes on top of or inside the object. These can be protrusions or cut outs. Then, do a final detail pass, such as pores or lines to break up the shape.

== Sculpting programs ==
There are a number of digital sculpting tools available. Some popular tools for creating are:

- 3D-Coat
- Adobe Substance 3D Modeler
- Autodesk Alias
- CB model pro
- Curvy 3D
- Geomagic Freeform
- Geomagic Sculpt
- Kodon
- Medium by Adobe
- Mudbox
- Nomad Sculpt
- Shapelab (VR)
- SharpConstruct
- ZBrush
- SculptGL
- DigiKlay

Traditional 3D modeling suites are also beginning to include sculpting capability. 3D modeling programs which currently feature some form of sculpting include the following:

- 3ds Max
- Blender
- Bryce
- Cinema4D
- Form-Z
- Houdini
- Lightwave 3D
- Maya
- MODO
- Poser
- Rhinoceros 3D
- SelfCAD
- Silo
- SketchUp
- Softimage XSI
- Strata 3D
- TrueSpace

== See also ==
- 2.5D
- 3D modeling
- 3D printing
- List of digital art software
- NURBS (non-uniform rational B-spline)
- Polygon mesh
- Polygonal modeling
- Sketch-based modeling
- Subdivision surface
- Voxel
