= ZBrush =

Digital sculpting tool

Maxon ZBrush

- Screenshot of ZBrush 4.0 (2010)
- Developer: Maxon
- Release: 1999; 27 years ago
- Stable release: ZBrush 2027.0.1 / October 14, 2026; 11 days ago
- Written in: C; C++; Python
- Operating system: Windows 10 version 1709 and later macOS 11.5 and later
- Type: 3D computer graphics
- License: Commercial proprietary software - Shareware
- Website: www.maxon.net/en/zbrush

Maxon ZBrush is a digital sculpting tool that combines 3D/2.5D modeling, texturing and painting. It uses a proprietary "pixol" technology which stores lighting, color, material, orientation and depth information for the points making up all objects on the screen. ZBrush shares some similarities with traditional sculpting.

ZBrush is used for creating "high-resolution" models (ie. models that reach 40+ million polygons) for use in movies, games, and animations, by companies ranging from ILM and Wētā FX, to Epic Games and Electronic Arts. ZBrush uses dynamic levels of resolution to allow sculptors to make global or local changes to their models. ZBrush is most known for being able to sculpt medium- to high-frequency details that were traditionally painted in bump maps. The resulting mesh details can then be exported as normal maps to be used on a low poly version of that same model. They can also be exported as a displacement map, although, in that case, the lower poly version generally requires more resolution. Or, once completed, the 3D model can be projected onto the background, becoming a 2.5D image (upon which further effects can be applied). Work can then begin on another 3D model which can be used in the same scene. This feature lets users work within complicated scenes without a heavy processor overhead.

ZBrush was developed by the company Pixologic Inc, founded by Ofer Alon (also known by the alias "Pixolator") and Jack Rimokh. The software was presented in 1999 at SIGGRAPH. The demo version, 1.55, was released in 2003, and version 3.1 was released in 2007. ZBrush 4 for Windows and Mac systems was announced on April 21, 2009 for an August release, but was later postponed. Version 3.5 was made available in September the same year, and includes some of the newer features initially intended for ZBrush 4.

Through GoZ ("Go ZBrush"), available starting in Version 4, ZBrush offers integration with other 3D graphics programs such as Autodesk Maya, Autodesk 3ds Max, Cinema 4D, LightWave 3D, Poser Pro, Daz Studio, EIAS, Modo and Blender.

ZBrush was purchased by the software company Maxon in January 2022. Since then, ZBrush has been added to the company's Maxon One subscription service. In addition, the Redshift renderer was integrated into ZBrush.

== Pixol ==
Like a pixel, each "pixol" contains information on X and Y position and color values. Additionally, it contains information on depth (or Z position), orientation and material. ZBrush-related files store pixol information, but when these maps are exported (e.g., to JPEG or PNG formats) they are flattened and the pixol data is lost. This technique is similar in concept to a voxel, another kind of 3D pixel.

== Features ==
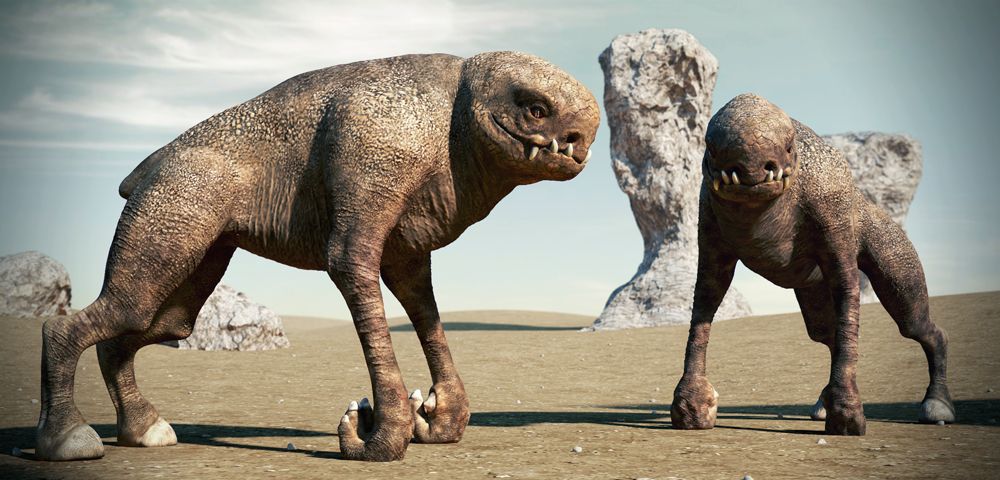
An example of a scene made using ZBrush

ZBrush comes with many features to aid in the sculpting of models and meshes.

=== 3D Brushes ===
The initial download of ZBrush comes with thirty 3D sculpting brushes, and more are available for download. Each brush offers unique attributes while allowing general control over hardness, intensity, and size. Alphas, which are used to create a specific pattern or shape, and textures are also editable features of the brushes.

=== Polypaint ===
Polypainting allows users to paint on an object's surface without the need to first assign a texture map by adding color directly to the polygons.

=== Illustration ===
ZBrush also gives the ability to sculpt in 2.5D and comes with several brushes for that purpose. A pixol put down when sculpting or illustrating in 2.5D contains information on its own color, depth, material, position and lighting information.

=== Transpose ===
ZBrush also has a feature that is similar to skeletal animation in other 3D programs. The transpose feature allows a user to isolate a part of the model and pose it without the need of skeletal rigging.

=== ZSpheres ===
A user can create a base mesh with uniform topology and then convert it into a sculptable model by starting out with a simple sphere and extracting more "ZSpheres", until the basic shape of the desired model is created.

=== GoZ ===
GoZ tab in Autodesk Maya's shelf

Introduced in ZBrush 3.2 OS X, GoZ automates setting up shading networks for normal, displacement, and texture maps of the 3D models in GoZ-enabled applications. Upon sending the mesh back to ZBrush, GoZ will automatically remap the existing high-resolution details to the incoming mesh. GoZ will take care of operations such as correcting points & polygons order. The updated mesh is immediately ready for further detailing, map extractions, and transferring to any other GoZ-enabled application.

=== Best Preview Render ===
Also included is a full render suite known as Best Preview Render, which allows use of full 360° environment maps to light scenes using HDRI images. BPR includes a new light manipulation system called LightCaps. With it, one can not only adjust how the lights in the scene are placed around the model, but also generate environments based on it for HDRI rendering later on. It also allows for material adjustments in real-time. Material properties such as subsurface scattering are supported as are environmental and scan-line reflections. BPR also includes a set of built-in filters that can be used in real time to create dramatic effects and corrections without even touching another photo-manipulation program.

=== DynaMesh ===
This allows ZBrush to quickly generate a new model with uniform polygon distribution, to improve the topology of models and eliminate polygon stretching.

=== Fibermesh ===
Fibermesh is a feature that allows users to grow polygon fibers out of their models or to make various botanical items. It is also a way to edit and manipulate large amounts of polygons at once with Groom brushes.

=== ZRemesher ===
It is an automatic retopology system previously called QRemesher that creates a new topology based on the original mesh. The new topology is generally more clean and uniform. This is a process that also helps to reduce or increase the polygon count. This process can also be guided by the user to make the new topology follow curves in the model and retain more detail in specified areas.

=== Shadowbox ===
Shadowbox allows the user to draw a rough silhouette of what they want to model, onto the inside of a virtual box. In real-time, any changes to the drawings are applied to a 3D model, upon which further details can be applied. The feature can best be utilized for hard surface modeling.

=== ZBrush for iPad ===
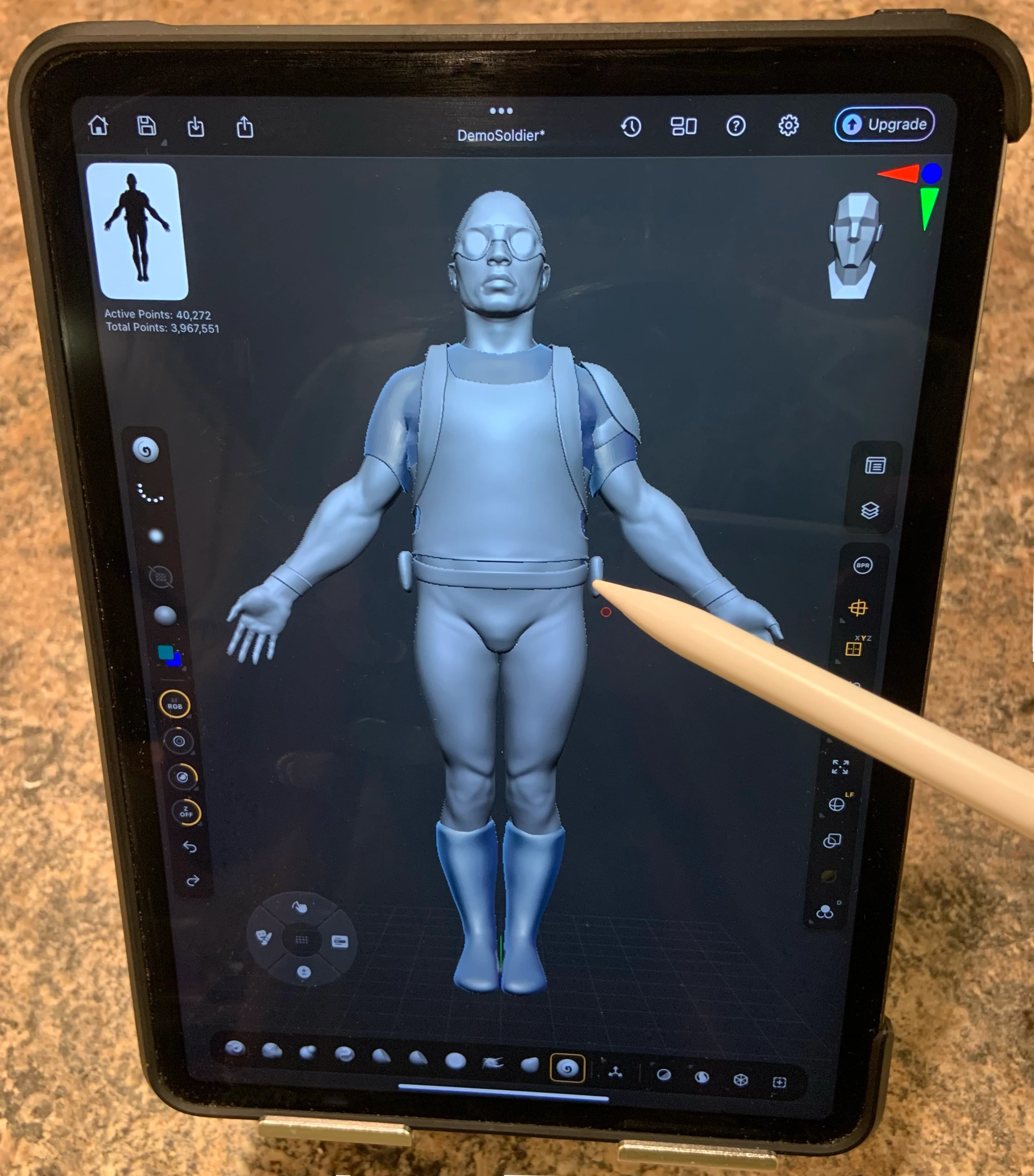
Zbrush for iPad

In September 2024, Maxon released ZBrush for iPad, bringing the software's digital sculpting and painting tools to mobile devices. The app supports Apple Pencil input, touch gestures, and high-polygon meshes, and includes many of the brushes and features found in the desktop version. ZBrush for iPad is available as a free download with a subscription option for full features.

== See also ==
- Heightmap
- Mudbox
- Lightwave 3D
- Electric Image Animation System
- Cinema 4D
- Modo
- Blender
- Adobe Substance 3D Modeler
