= Redshift (renderer) =

3D rendering software

- Original authors: Nicolas Burtnyk; Panagiotis Zompolas; Rob Slater
- Developers: Maxon, Redshift Rendering Technologies Inc.
- Release: 2014; 12 years ago
- Stable release: 2026.4.0 / March 17, 2026; 4 months ago
- Operating system: Microsoft Windows, macOS, Linux
- Type: 3D rendering
- License: Proprietary
- Website: maxon.net/en/redshift

Redshift is a GPU-accelerated 3D rendering software developed by Redshift Rendering Technologies Inc., now a subsidiary of Maxon.

== Overview ==
According to the developer's claim, Redshift is the first 3D renderer with full GPU acceleration on the market. It was initially released in 2014 by Redshift Rendering Technologies Inc.

In 2017 Redshift experimented with a virtual reality input user interface, initially tailored for architects.

In 2019 the Redshift Rendering Technologies Inc. was acquired along with all rights on its software product by the German 3D software company Maxon, the developer of Cinema 4D.

On 13 April 2021 the software received its first version for macOS, natively supporting both Apple M1 GPU and AMD GPUs on Intel-based Macs. To do so, the port utilises the Apple Metal API.

== Notable studios using Redshift ==
=== North America ===
==== United States ====
- Baked Studio
- Deva Studios

==== Canada ====
- Guru Studio
- Monsters Aliens Robots Zombies

=== Europe ===
==== United Kingdom ====
- Ritzy Animation

=== Asia ===
==== Thailand ====
- Treacle

==== China ====
- Original Force
