= Retopology =

Step in the 3D modeling process

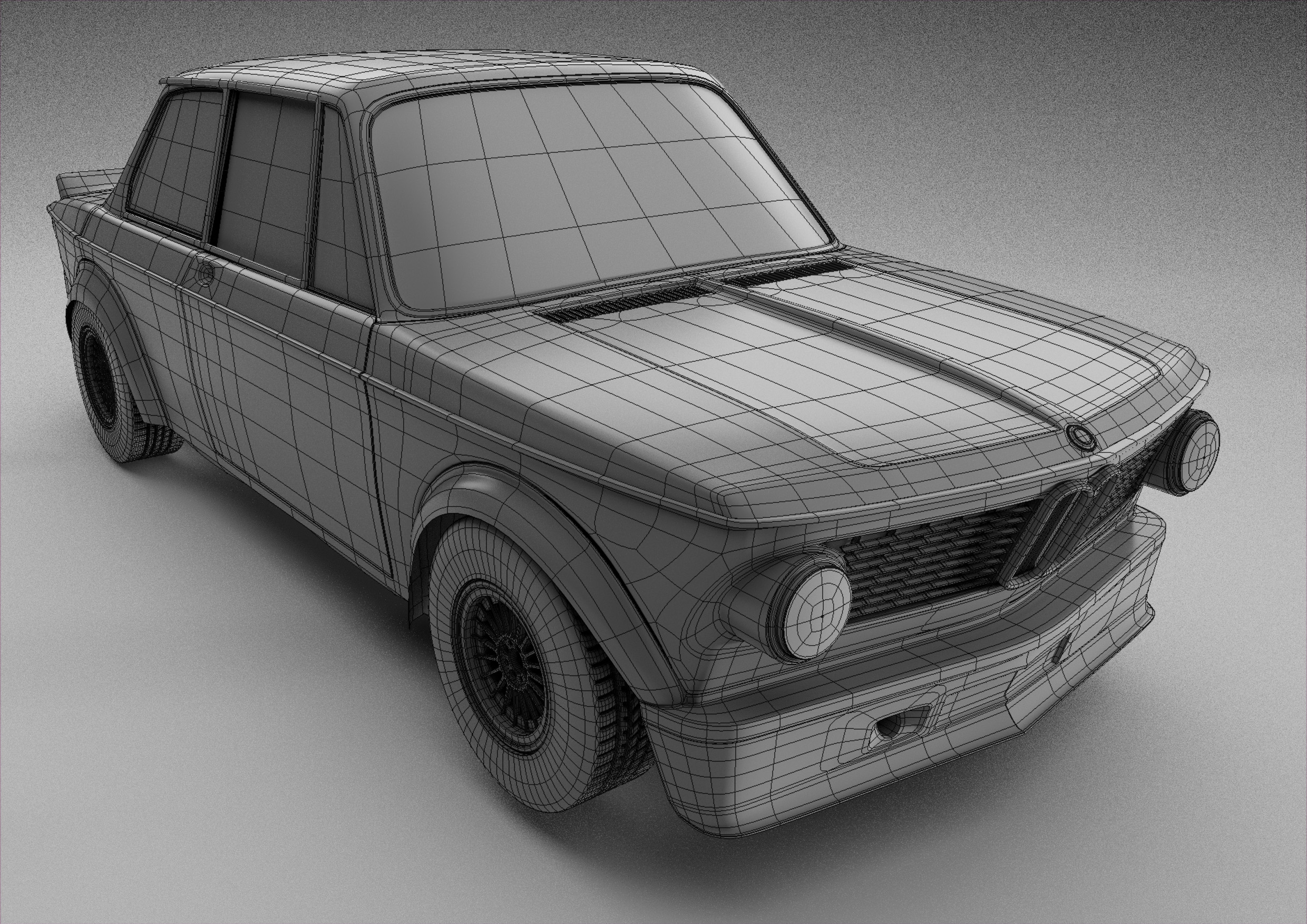
3D mesh visible on a model of a BMW 2002

Retopology (or retopo) is a step in the 3D modeling process where an object's polygonal mesh is modified or recreated to obtain a cleaner layout while maintaining nearly the same physical shape of the model. Owing to its complexity, retopology is currently a mostly manual process but tools exist to assist 3D artists with the workflow. Automated and semi-automated retopology algorithms are an active field of research; state-of-the-art techniques provide good results in some, but not all, cases. Most organically-shaped models, especially those that are animated or used in real-time applications, must be created with clean topology to deform properly (if skeletal animation is employed), render with smooth and accurate shading, and avoid excessive polygon counts that can reduce performance.

Retopology plays an important role in numerous industries such as animation, gaming, visual effects, virtual reality, and 3D printing. In animation and gaming, retopology ensures that characters and assets deform smoothly during movement, allowing for realistic and believable animations. In visual effects, it enables the creation of high-quality models with optimal geometry for seamless integration into live-action footage, while in 3D printing it is used to optimize models for efficient printing processes.

== Purpose ==
The purpose of retopology is to create and improve an efficient and well-structure cleaned 3D model that is appropriate for the further production process such as animation, real-time rendering, and texturing, and further applications such as structural analysis. It involves rearranging and optimizing the model's topology by reducing and cleaning unnecessary polygons while maintaining its overall shape and important details without requiring a high polygon count. This helps reduce problems with high polygon counts such as large file asset size, longer rendering time, longer loading time, increased hardware requirements and the higher production costs.

Furthermore, texture baking can also be used to transfer details from the original model to the new low-poly mesh allowing it to maintain visual detail quality without requiring a high polygon count. In addition, retopology plays an important role in character animation by improving 3D models deform during movements. Poor topology can cause unnatural deformation and make certain movements difficult to achieve. By optimizing character edge flow and creating a well-structured mesh, retopology allows the model to deform more naturally and smoothly while maintaining their original shape. It simplify the weight-painting process, and making character rigging and animation more efficient.

=== High-poly to Low-poly ===
One of the main purposes of retopology is to convert complex high-poly models into simpler low-poly models that are easier to manage in later production stages. High-poly models contain a large number of polygons, allowing modelers to create smooth surfaces, complex shapes, and fine details. On the opposite side, low-poly models use fewer polygons, resulting in simpler geometry that requires fewer computational resources. The decision between high-poly and low-poly models is contingent upon the technical requirements and the project.

High-poly models are commonly used in digital sculpting to create detailed 3D assets, applied in architectural visualization to capture every intricate detail, and utilized in film and CGI production for creating ultra-realistic scenes. While low-poly models are suited for virtual reality, augmented reality, and game development, even more for mobile games, and open-world games as low-poly models reduce the computational load which enhance the game to rendering and maintaining smooth performances. So retopology allows modeler to reconstruct these models with more organized mesh and fewer polygons while keeping their overall original shape and features which can be used more efficiently in later production process.

=== Polygon Reduction/ File-size reduction ===
The file sizes of high-resolution models often contain large number of vertices, edges, and faces, which increase file size and require more computer processing resources. Retopology is essential for storage and real-time applications, it reduce unnecessary geometry such as vertices and edges by creating a simpler mesh while maintaining the model's overall shape. With fewer polygons to process, the model can be easier to store, edit, render in real-time application such as video games. However, the less polygon you use may affect the model's appearance, as additional geometry is sometimes needed to represent complex shapes and fine details.

== Topology Principles ==
Topology in 3D modeling is the geometric surface arrangement and connectivity that form fundamental polygon mesh which are vertices, edges, and faces. In three-dimensional space, vertices are the points that define corners of polygons, edges are the lines that connect these points, and faces are flat surfaces that fill the space between edges which form the model's surface or mostly refer to polygons. The arrangement of these components influences the model's geometric structure, surface smoothness, and ability to deform during animation. Effective topology organizes polygons according to the geometry and intended use of the model, helping maintain visual quality while avoiding unnecessary geometric complexity.

There are three types of polygon meshes which are triangles, quadrilaterals (quad), and polygons with more than four sides (n-gons). Triangles have three edges which frequently used to represent polygon surfaces in computer graphics as the game engines triangulate everything after import into it. Quads contains four edges which are the most commonly used in retopology because quads allow for continuous edge loops and regular subdivision. It enhance the mesh to subdivide smoothly, deform easily when animated, and unwrap UV cleanly for next texturing process. N-gons can visualize complex shapes with fewer faces which are not commonly used because some program cannot read n-gons and it will disappear in that program which may require additional subdivision or triangulation during further process.

Since the game engines changes everything into triangulate. It is the ideal which face type is the best to use before export. For that, triangles or n-gons are appropriate for flat areas that won't be touched again. However, quads win wherever the mesh will be altered subdivision, deformation, or edge loops selection.

== Retopology Methods ==
The retopology method usually starts with a high-resolution mesh. A new topology is then created with fewer polygons while keeping the shape close to the original model. The methods can be done by three common ways, manual, automatic, and semi-automatic retopology.

In manual retopology, the artist will draw polygons by hand over a high resolution model which follows the shape of the muscles or facial features. This method gives the artist more control over the edge flow, especially around areas that need to bend or deform. On the other hand, Automatic retopology is faster because the software generates the new topology automatically, but the result may need some adjustment.

However, some automatic methods use topology created by an artist as a guide. For example, the artist can first create a template and software can use it to create consistent topology for different facial movements.

For quadrilateral meshes, edge flow is also an important part of mesh quality. The edges should follow important features of the model, which makes it easier for artists to select useful edge loops. However, it can be difficult for an automatic algorithm to create the best edge flow, so some methods allow the artist to adjust the result.

== Retopology Process ==
Retopology may be performed manually, automatically, or through combinations as each method suited to differently stages of modeling process.

The process generally begins with high-resolution model which serves as reference for constructing a new mesh that follows its overall shape and surface features. New polygons are then created over the original surface, the topology is further refined by adjusting edge flow and polygon distribution according to the original model's surface features. This may includes repositioning vertices, redirecting edge loops, and modify polygon connections. Then optimizing by removing unnecessary polygons, the amount of polycount determine on the intended use and the level of geometric detail.

Following retopology, the model may undergo UV unwrapping and texture baking, in which enhance surface details in high-resolution mesh to transferred to texture maps for use on the lower-resolution model.

== Uses ==
Retopology is used in different areas of 3D production. It can also be used in cultural heritage and structural analysis. It can simplify detailed 3D models and make them suitable for structural analysis while keeping the shape close to the original object.

In animation and visual effects, retopology is used to prepare detailed 3d models for animation. Good topology is important because it affects how a character model deforms during movement. It can also make weight painting easier while maintaining the original form of the character. For facial animation, artists can create a new edge layout over a high-resolution face model to prepare it for animation which can be done in a high-resolution model. This helps the face model deform better during facial movements.

In video games, retopology can be used to optimize detailed 3D models for game production. High-poly models may not be suitable for game production because they can increase asset size, loading time, and rendering time. Therefore, retopology can be used to reduce the geometry of these models, while texture baking can be used to keep important visual details. This can make 3D assets more suitable for use in game.

In digital sculpting, models often have a high number of polygons and poor edge flow which can make optimization and rigging more difficult. Retopology can be used to create a lower-poly version of the sculpted model with cleaner edge flow while keeping the shape close to the high-resolution model. This make the model more suitable for further uses such as games and animation.

Moreover, retopology can also be used in virtual reality (VR) and augmented reality (AR). It can reduce the polygon count of detailed 3D models and improve real-time performance while maintaining important visual details. The models can then be used to create VR and AR experiences.

== Software/tools ==
Retopology can be done using different 3D modeling software and tools. Some software includes built-in retopology tools, while other software is designed specifically for retopology to help artists create and improve the topology of 3D models.

=== Autodesk Maya ===
Autodesk Maya provides the Quad Draw tool for retopology. It allows artists to create a new mesh over an existing model and prepare it for production. Artists can also use quad draw to add polygons and adjust the topology of the mesh.

=== Blender ===
Blender provides tools for both manual retopology and automatic remeshing. Artists can use tools such as Poly Build and Snapping to create new topology over an existing model. Blender also provides remeshing tools to rebuild mesh geometry automatically.

=== ZBrush ===
ZBrush provides tools for both manual and autometic retopology. The Retopology Brush allows artists to create new topology manually over high-resolution models, while ZRemesher can generate new topology automatically.

=== 3DCoat ===
3DCoat includes several retopology tools for creating and editing mesh topology. Artists can manually create polygons using tools such as Add/Split, Points/Faces, and Quads, or use auto-retopology to generate new topology automatically.

=== TopoGun ===
TopoGun is a standalone application designed specifically for retopology. It includes tools for both manual and automatic retopology, allowing artists to create and adjust toopology over high-resolution models. It also supports texture baking to transfer details from high-resolution models to lower-poly meshes.
