= Adobe Streamline =

Discontinued line tracing software

- The Adobe Systems Logo
- Developer(s): Adobe Systems
- Stable release: 4.0 / 25 July 2001; 23 years ago
- Platform: Intel i486 (Windows) and 68030 (Classic Mac OS)
- Type: Line tracing
- License: Proprietary
- Website: www.adobe.com/products/streamline/

Adobe Streamline is a discontinued line tracing program developed and published by Adobe Systems. Its primary purpose is to convert scanned bitmaps into vector artwork. Streamline is similar in function to competitors, such as Corel Trace, but was advertised as a standalone rather than an additional utility within a full drawing suite. Streamline was discontinued after Adobe Illustrator CS2 introduced a new tracing tool entitled Live Trace, which provides fast tracing, fine control, as well as a "live link" to the bitmap being traced. A test of the native Illustrator 9 auto-trace function by Creative Pro in 2002 concluded: "The premier tracing utility is StreamLine, which is infinitely controllable and very accurate."

== History ==
In 1989, at the MacWorld Exposition in San Francisco, Adobe introduced Adobe Streamline. They demonstrated it as a program that could reproduce hardcopy graphics onscreen, converting bit-mapped images to high-quality PostScript artwork. Later, Adobe released Streamline for IBM computers and the Windows operating system. Adobe Streamline 4.0 was priced at $199.00 for a new user and $69.00 as an upgrade. After Adobe Streamline 4.0, the most popular tools in the program, those relating to line conversion, were incorporated into Adobe Illustrator CS2's Live Trace tool.

== Uses of Adobe Streamline ==
Adobe Streamline is advertised as a way to convert images into line art (bitmap into vectors). In the User Guide for Streamline 3.0, Adobe gives many examples of what the program can be used for. Besides creating a line drawing from a photo, Adobe suggests posterizing a photo and editing color, colorizing greyscale images, and using other special line effects. They also show users creating movie posters, business logos, architectural sketches, brochures, legal forms, newsletters, stamp blocks, and illustrations. Users can then export their work from Adobe Streamline and edit it in other ways in Adobe Illustrator.

== Features ==
Features new to Version 3.0

System requirements
	Minimum	Recommended
Classic Mac OS
Operating system	Apple system software 6.07 or higher	
CPU	68020 processor	Any later model processor
Memory	2 MB	4 MB

- One can now convert color photographic images or color drawings into PostScript language artwork containing up to 256 colors. Users have the ability to create and save custom colors and import custom color styles from Adobe Illustrator files.
- Adobe added interactive editing, meaning when a user edits and paints the image, the effects are shown immediately.
- Users can edit an image in Preview Mode, allowing him or her to see colors and illustration features as edits are taking place. Users can also preview only selected parts of the image, reducing the time it takes to redraw the screen during editing.
- Adobe added the ability to save images in Aldus Freehand format (in addition to Adobe Illustrator, PICT, and DXF).
- Users can now instantly save and retrieve conversion options.
- In 3.0 Adobe introduced support for acquiring images directly from a scanner.
- Users have an expanded palette of editing tools (including the magic wand tool).
- Users can now cut and paste PostScript language artwork on the Clipboard, allowing interaction with other programs such as Adobe Illustrator and Adobe Photoshop.
- Adobe added support for copying line art into Adobe Photoshop 2.5 file format.

Features new to Version 4.0

System requirements
	Minimum	Recommended
Microsoft Windows
Operating system	Windows 95 or Windows NT 4.0	
CPU	Intel® i486 processor	Intel Pentium or faster
Memory	16 MB	32 MB
Free space	20 MB of free space	
Classic Mac OS
Operating system	Mac OS 7.5 to Mac OS 9.2.2 and the Classic Environment	
CPU	68030 or faster processor	PowerPC processor
Memory	8 MB	32 MB
Free space	20 MB of free space	

- Scan images and sketches into Adobe Streamline, or import line art, logos, color photos, and other art files. Begin by using predetermined settings for ease of learning, then experiment with custom conversion settings, such as outline, centerline, line recognition, and more. Save them for reuse, minimizing the work for later conversions.
- Convert without gaps, overlapping paths, or other inaccuracies. Streamline compensates for improper alignment of scanned images and straightens horizontal and vertical lines.
- Let Adobe Streamline select the appropriate colors up to an unlimited number, or specify a custom color list (spot colors).Simulate duotones, tritones, and quadtones with tints of custom colors.
- Designate separate settings specific to different areas of the same image. If you have multiple images to convert - such as a set of logos - you can batch process all the files.

Compatibility

Adobe Streamline was integrated with many other Adobe products such as Adobe Photoshop, Adobe PageMaker, Adobe Illustrator, Adobe Dimensions, and Adobe PageMill.

== See also ==
- Adobe Illustrator
- Adobe Systems
