= Infltr =

infltr
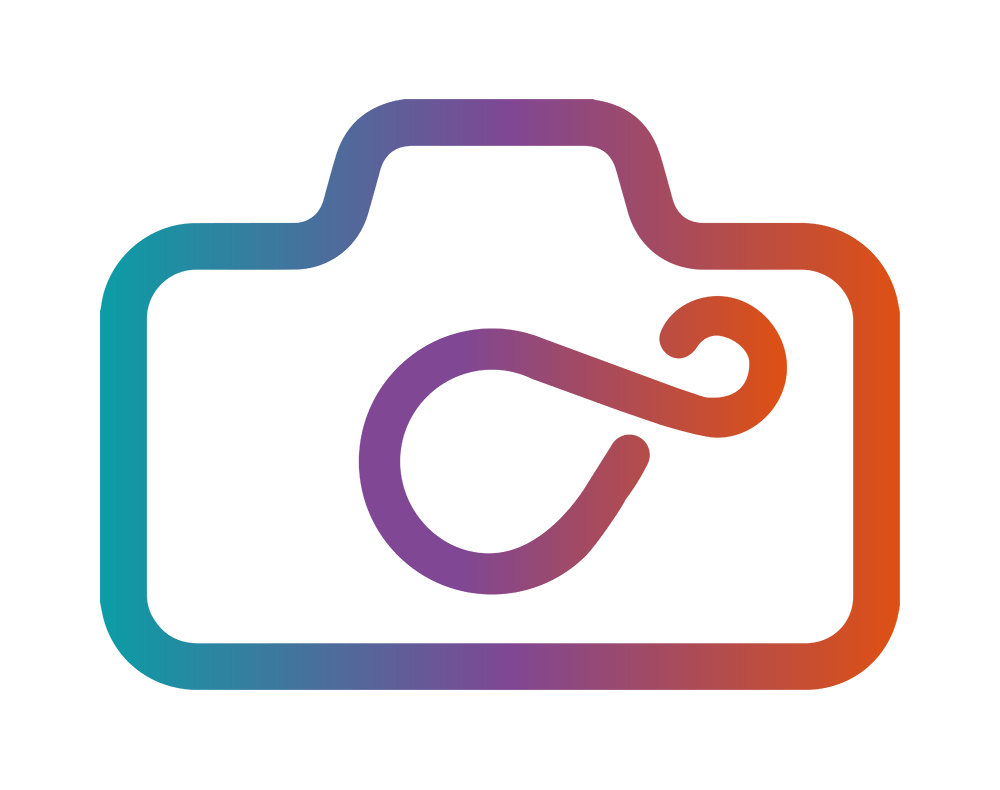

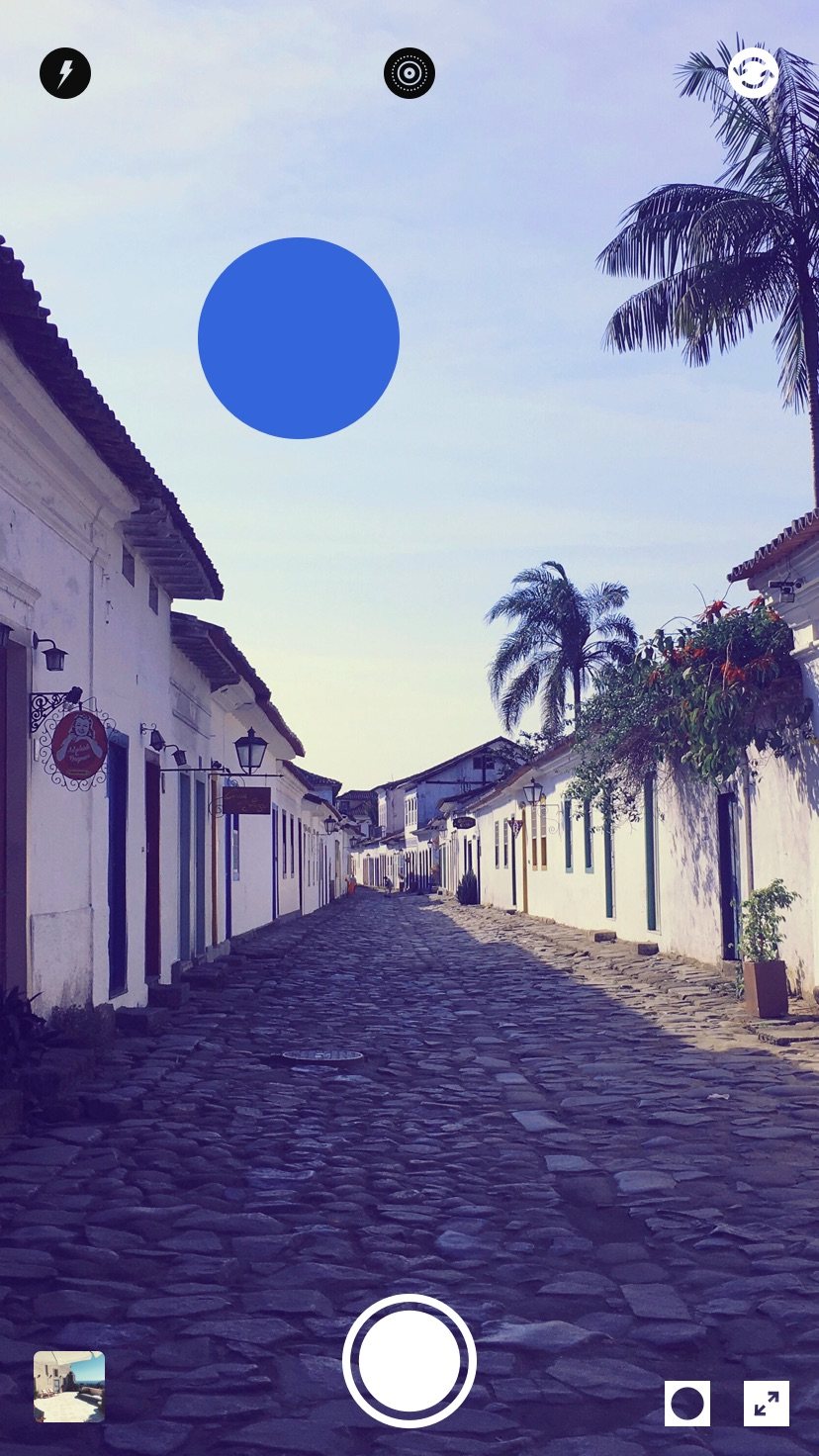
- Infltr v2.5 camera screen running on iOS
- Initial release: August 2015; 9 years ago
- Operating system: iOS
- Available in: English, French, Dutch, Spanish, Russian, Swedish, Japanese, Korean, Vietnamese, Indonesian, Italian, Finnish, Danish, Norwegian, Chinese, Portuguese, Malay, German, Thai, Greek, Turkish
- Type: Image editing software
- License: Commercial proprietary software

Infltr (stylised as infltr), the conflation of "infinite filters" is an image editing app for Apple iOS devices. The first version of the mobile app was launched in August 2015 as an alternative to the standard iOS camera app.

It relies on techniques from game development to offer more than 5 million filters available in real time. There are no presets. Rather than a selection of filters chosen by its developer, the user creates their own. The user slides their finger over the screen to change filter. A swipe of the finger allows movement through the color spectrum, or a tap of the screen changes to a new one.

Infltr allows sharing of pictures via text message, email or social media.

The second version of Infltr was released in February 2016. It integrates with Adobe's Creative SDK which allows users to edit pictures from their online Creative Cloud and Lightroom account. Users can also send images from Infltr to Photoshop and Illustrator on their desktop computer.

In December 2016, Infltr launched an iMessage App which allows use of the iPhone & iPad camera. It allows changing filter and sending photos and Live Photos from Apple's Message App. To complement photos & Live Photos filters, video filters have been introduced. Unlike other video editing applications, it is possible to touch the screen and change the filter while the video is playing, in real time. Infltr is localized in 22 languages.

== Awards and nominations ==
Infltr was nominated at The 2016 Europas in the Coolest Technology Innovation category and was a finalist at Fast Company's 2016 Innovation by Design Awards in the App category.
In May 2016, Tumblr selected Infltr as one of "the best creative tools for Tumblr".
