= Colligan =

Colligan is a surname. Notable people with the surname include:

- Bud Colligan (born 1954), businessman and government advisor
- Ed Colligan (born 1961), businessman
- George Colligan (born 1969), jazz pianist
- Brian McColligan (born 1980), Scottish footballer
- Matthew Colligan, American far-right online personality

== See also ==
- Colligan River, river in Ireland
