= Macromedia Authorware =

E-learning authoring tool

- Macromedia Authorware 6 running on Windows XP
- Original author: Michael W. Allen
- Developers: Authorware Inc. (1987–1992); Macromedia (1992–2005); Adobe (2005–2007; support only)
- Final release: 7.02 / 2003; 23 years ago
- Operating system: Microsoft Windows and Mac OS X
- Type: Integrated development environment
- License: Commercial proprietary software
- Website: www.adobe.com/products/authorware/ (redirects to Adobe Captivate)

Macromedia Authorware is a discontinued e-learning authoring tool with its own interpreted, flowchart-based, graphical programming language. Authorware was used for creating interactive e-learning programs that could integrate a range of multimedia content, particularly electronic educational technology (also called e-learning) applications. The flowchart model differentiates Authorware from other authoring tools, such as Adobe Flash and Adobe Director, which rely on a visual stage, time-line and script structure.

== History ==
Authorware was originally produced by Authorware Inc., founded in 1987 by Michael W. Allen. Allen had contributed to the development of the PLATO computer-assisted instruction system during the 1970s that was developed jointly by the University of Illinois and Control Data Corporation. CDC, where Allen was Director of Advanced Instructional Systems R&D, invested heavily in the development of an expansive library of interactive "courseware" to run on the PLATO system.

PLATO courseware was developed in a unique programming language called TUTOR, which provided structures unique to learning interactions, such as answer judging and branching. TUTOR programmers were able to build powerful scripted systems that included simulations and games. However, despite the intent to create a special-purpose programming language usable by educators, and the decades of work that went into it, the TUTOR language was not easy to learn.

Authorware started as a system aimed at addressing the problems in TUTOR. Originally titled Course of Action (CoA), it was a Mac-only program, but produced runtime programs for both the Mac and MS-DOS. Later named Authorware it was produced as a MS-DOS runtime version until the release of the first Windows version.

Authorware used a visual interface with icons, representing essential components of the interactive learning experience. "Authors" placed icons along a “flowline” to create a sequence of events. Icons represented such components as Display—put something on the screen, Question—ask the learner for a response, Calc—perform a calculation, read data, and/or store data, and Animate—move something around on the screen. By simply placing the icons in sequence and adjusting their properties, authors could instantly see the structure of program they were creating and, most importantly, run it to see what learners would see. On-screen changes were easy to make, even while the program was running.

Authorware Inc. merged with MacroMind/Paracomp in 1992 to form Macromedia. In December 2005, Adobe and Macromedia merged, under the Adobe Systems name. The most recent version of Authorware is 7.02; version 7 was released in 2003. The Authorware player has some issues with Internet Explorer 7 and later under Windows Vista due to Protected mode as well as runtime errors due to a bug in Authorware's implementation of ReadURL() Javascript function.

It was generally known in the Authorware development community that version 8.0 was in production prior to the merger between the two companies, with 4 beta versions released to external testing shortly before the merger was completed. Among several other features intended for the new version, the ability to publish to Flash's SWF (ShockWave Flash) was at the top of the list. Once production shifted to Adobe's off-shore development facility in Bangalore, India, the free-flow of information that had been enjoyed between Macromedia's engineering team and its beta testers was curtailed. On Friday, 3 August 2007, after several years of keeping the development community in limbo, Adobe finally announced its plans to discontinue development of Authorware.

== Usage and features ==
Authorware's distinctive style revolved around a central icon: the Interaction Icon. The structure of the authoring environment encouraged rich interaction; complex user feed-back was not only possible but somewhat suggested by the software, rather than suggesting the usual media diffusion. This Interaction Icon allowed various forms of user feedback (move object to, along a line, click an object or hot-spot; plus the usual text-entry, keypress, etc.)

The original strength in education of Authorware could be linked to its roots in pedagogical models based on constructivist views.

Authorware programs start by creating a flowline, which is a flowchart showing the structure of the developer's program. The developer can add and manage text, graphics, animation, sound and video; develop interactivity and add navigational elements such as links, buttons, and menus. Macromedia Flash and Macromedia Director movies can also be integrated into an Authorware project. "Xtra Extensions" (or "Xtras") could also be used to extend the functionality of Authorware, which is similar to HyperCard's XCMDs. Authorware's power can be even better utilized with the use of variables, functions and expressions. Authorware could interpret both its built-in proprietary scripting language and JavaScript version 1.5.

Authorware programs could be distributed as stand-alone executable files, or over the web which required a proprietary Authorware Web Player. Adobe also distributed free stand-alone players for Mac and Windows.

=== Use in eLearning ===
Authorware was particularly well suited to eLearning content, as it included highly customizable templates for Computer-based training and web-based training, including learning assessment tools. Working with these templates, businesses and schools could rapidly assemble multimedia training materials without needing to hire a full-fledged programmer. Intuitively named dialog boxes took care of input and output. The flow chart model made the re-use of lesson elements straightforward. Being both AICC- and SCORM-compliant, Authorware could be used to deliver content via any Learning Management System that supported AICC or SCORM.

=== Legacy ===
In Adobe's lineup of authoring tools, Adobe Captivate eventually became the flagship product. Authorware was officially discontinued in 2007. The final release, in 2003, was version 7.0.2.

== See also ==
- Adobe Captivate
