= Macromedia FreeHand =

Discontinued graphics software

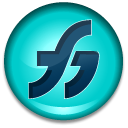

- FreeHand MX on Mac OS X
- Other names: Masterpiece (working title); Virtuoso (NeXTSTEP)
- Original author: Altsys Corporation
- Developers: Adobe Systems, formerly Macromedia
- Release: 1988; 38 years ago
- Final release: MX (11.0.2) / 2003; 23 years ago
- Operating system: Mac OS X, Windows
- Type: vector graphics editor
- Website: www.adobe.com/mena_en/products/freehand/

Macromedia FreeHand (formerly Aldus FreeHand) is a discontinued computer application for creating two-dimensional vector graphics oriented primarily to professional illustration, desktop publishing and content creation for the Web. FreeHand was similar in scope, intended market, and functionality to Adobe Illustrator, CorelDRAW and Xara Designer Pro. Because of FreeHand's dedicated page layout and text control features, it also compares to Adobe InDesign and QuarkXPress. Professions using FreeHand include graphic design, illustration, cartography, fashion and textile design, product design, architects, scientific research, and multimedia production.

FreeHand was created by Altsys Corporation in 1988 and licensed to Aldus Corporation, which released versions 1 through 4. In 1994, Aldus merged with Adobe Systems and because of the overlapping market with Adobe Illustrator, FreeHand was returned to Altsys by order of the Federal Trade Commission. Altsys was later bought by Macromedia, which released FreeHand versions 5 through 11 (FreeHand MX). In 2005, Adobe Systems acquired Macromedia and its product line which included FreeHand MX, under whose ownership it presently resides.

Since 2003, FreeHand development has been discontinued; in the Adobe Systems catalog, FreeHand has been replaced by Adobe Illustrator.

FreeHand MX continues to run under Windows 11 and under Mac OS X 10.6 (Snow Leopard) within Rosetta, a PowerPC code emulator, and requires a registration patch supplied by Adobe. FreeHand 10 runs without problems on Mac OS X Snow Leopard with Rosetta enabled, and does not require a registration patch. Later versions of macOS can use a Mac OS X Snow Leopard Server virtual machine to emulate the required PowerPC support.

== History ==
=== Altsys and Aldus FreeHand ===
In 1984, James R. Von Ehr founded Altsys Corporation to develop graphics applications for personal computers. Based in Plano, Texas, the company initially produced font editing and conversion software; Fontastic Plus, Metamorphosis, and the Art Importer. Their premier PostScript font-design package, Fontographer, was released in 1986 and was the first such program on the market. With the PostScript background having been established by Fontographer, Altsys also developed FreeHand (originally called Masterpiece) as a Macintosh Postscript-based illustration program that used Bézier curves for drawing and was similar to Adobe Illustrator. FreeHand was announced as "... a Macintosh graphics program described as having all the features of Adobe's Illustrator plus drawing tools such as those in Mac Paint and Mac Draft and special effects similar to those in Cricket Draw." Seattle's Aldus Corporation acquired a licensing agreement with Altsys Corporation to release FreeHand along with their flagship product, Pagemaker, and Aldus FreeHand 1.0 was released in 1988. FreeHand's product name used intercaps; the F and H were capitalized.

The partnership between the two companies continued with Altsys developing FreeHand and with Aldus controlling marketing and sales. After 1988, a competitive exchange between Aldus FreeHand and Adobe Illustrator ensued on the Macintosh platform with each software advancing new tools, achieving better speed, and matching significant features. Windows PC development also allowed Illustrator 2 (aka, Illustrator 88 on the Mac) and FreeHand 3 to release Windows versions to the graphics market.

FreeHand 1.0 sold for $495 in 1988. It included the standard drawing tools and features as other draw programs including special effects in fills and screens, text manipulation tools, and full support for CMYK color printing. It was also possible to create and insert PostScript routines anywhere within the program. FreeHand performed in preview mode instead of keyline mode but performance was slower.

FreeHand 2.0 sold for $495 in 1989. Besides improving on the features of FreeHand 1.0, FreeHand 2 added faster operation, Pantone colors, stroked text, flexible fill patterns and automatically import graphic assets from other programs. It added accurate control over a color monitor screen display, limited only by its resolution.

FreeHand 3.0 sold for $595 in 1991. New features included resizable color, style, and layer panels including an Attributes menu. Also tighter precision of both the existing tools and aligning of objects. FH3 created compound Paths. Text could be converted to paths, applied to an ellipse, or made vertical. Carried over from version 1.0, FreeHand 3 suffered by having text entered into a dialog box instead of directly to the page. In October 1991, a 3.1 upgrade made FreeHand work with System 7 but additionally, it supported pressure-sensitive drawing which offered varying line widths with a users stroke. It improved element manipulation and added more import/export options.

FreeHand 4.0 sold for $595 in 1994. Altsys ported FreeHand 3.0 to the NeXT system creating a new program named Virtuoso. Virtuoso continued its development at Altsys and version 2.0 of Virtuoso was feature-equivalent to FreeHand 4 (with the addition of NeXT-specific features such as Services and Display PostScript) and file compatible, with Virtuoso 2 able to open FreeHand 4 files and vice versa. A prominent feature of this version was the ability to type directly into the page and wrap inside or outside any shape. It also included drag-and-drop color imaging, a larger pasteboard, and a user interface that featured floating, rollup panels. The colors palette included a color mixer for adding new colors to the swatch list. Speed increases were made.

In the same year of FreeHand 4 release, Adobe Systems announced merger plans with Aldus Corporation for $525 million. Fear about the end of competition between these two leading applications was reported in the media and expressed by customers (Illustrator versus FreeHand and Adobe Photoshop versus Aldus PhotoStyler.) Because of this overlapping of the market, Altsys stepped in by suing Aldus, saying that the merger deal was "a prima facie violation of a non-compete clause within the FreeHand licensing agreement." Altsys CEO Jim Von Ehr explained, "No one loves FreeHand more than we do. We will do whatever it takes to see it survive." The Federal Trade Commission issued a complaint against Adobe Systems on October 18, 1994, ordering a divestiture of FreeHand to "remedy the lessening of competition resulting from the acquisition as alleged in the Commission's complaint," and further, the FTC ordering, "That for a period of ten (10) years from the date on which this order becomes final, respondents shall not, without the prior approval of the Commission, directly or indirectly, through subsidiaries, partnerships, or otherwise .. Acquire any Professional Illustration Software or acquire or enter into any exclusive license to Professional Illustration Software;" (referring to FreeHand.) FreeHand was returned to Altsys with all licensing and marketing rights as well as Aldus FreeHand's customer list.

=== Macromedia Freehand ===
By late 1994, Altsys still retained all rights to FreeHand. Despite brief plans to keep it in-house to sell it along with Fontographer and Virtuoso, Altsys reached an agreement with the multimedia software company, Macromedia, to be acquired. This mutual agreement provided FreeHand and Fontographer a new home with ample resources for marketing, sales, and competition against the newly merged Adobe-Aldus company. Altsys would remain in Richardson, Texas, but would be renamed as the Digital Arts Group of Macromedia and was responsible for the continued development of FreeHand. Macromedia received FreeHand's 200,000 customers and expanded its traditional product line of multimedia graphics software to illustration and design graphics software. CEO James Von Ehr became a Macromedia vice-president until 1997 when he left to start another venture.

FreeHand 5.0 sold for $595 in 1995. This version featured a more customizable and expanded workspace, multiple views, stronger design and editing tools, a report generator, spell check, paragraph styles, multicolor gradient fills up to 64 colors, speed improvements, and it accepted Illustrator plugins. In September 1995, a 5.5 upgrade added Photoshop plug-in support, PDF import capabilities, the Extract feature, inline graphics to text, improved auto-expanding text containers, the Crop feature, and the Create PICT Image feature.

A FreeHand 5.5 upgrade was part of the FreeHand Graphics Studio (a suite that included Fontographer, Macromedia xRes image editing application, and Extreme 3D animation and modeling application).

FreeHand 6.0 in 1996. This version only existed in beta. Some Freehand 7 prerelease versions were released under the Freehand 6 tag.

FreeHand 7.0 sold for $399 in 1996, or $449 as part of the FreeHand Graphics Studio (see above.) Features included a redesigned user interface that allowed recombining Inspectors, Panel Tabs, Dockable Panels, Smart Cursors, Drag and Drop with Adobe applications and QuarkXPress, Graphic Search and Replace, Java (programming language) and AppleScript Automation, Chart creation, and new Effects tools and functions. Shockwave was introduced to leverage graphics for the Web.

FreeHand 8.0 sold for $399 in 1998. This version began integrating to the Web with the ability to export graphics directly to Macromedia Flash. Customizable toolbars and keyboard shortcuts were prominent features. Also Lens Fill and Transparency, Freeform tool, Graphic Hose, Emboss Effects, and a "Collect for Output" function for print.

FreeHand 9.0 sold for $399 in 2000 or $449 as part of the Flash 4 FreeHand Studio bundle. This was a major repositioning for FreeHand emphasizing the Web and especially Flash output. Creating simple Flash animation from layers was featured. The Perspective Grid, Magic Wand Tracing tool, Lasso tool, and a Page tool that treated pages like objects (resize, clone, rotate, etc.)

FreeHand 10.0 sold for $399 in 2000 or $799 as part of the Studio MX bundle. Macromedia released this as Carbonized for both Mac OS 9 and Mac OS X. It shared a common Macromedia GUI Interface and several tools were added or renamed to match Flash tools. New features include Brushes, Master Pages, Print Area, and a Navigation Panel for adding links, names, and adding actions or notes to objects. Also "Smart cursor" Pen and Bezigon Tools and a Contour Gradient Fill.

A minor version of FreeHand 10 (10.0.1) came as a result of Adobe winning a lawsuit against Macromedia for infringement on a Tabbed Panels patent. A reworking of the user interface produced this temporary fix for the panel issue. 10.0.1 was available with the Studio MX bundle or as a new purchase but not available as a patch to existing users.

FreeHand MX sold for $399 in 2003 or for $1,580 as part of the Studio MX 2004 bundle. FreeHand 11 was marketed as FreeHand MX and featured tighter interface integration with the Macromedia MX line of products. This release also featured a revamped Object Panel where all attributes and text properties are centralized for editing, Multiple Attributes for unlimited effects, Live Effects, Live-edit of basic shapes, Connector Lines tool, Flash and Fireworks integration, Extrude, Erase, and Chart tools, along with improvements to the standard tools.

During the development of FreeHand MX, the customer install base was 400,000 users worldwide but because of competition with Adobe Illustrator's market share, Macromedia focused instead on its web oriented lineup of Flash, Dreamweaver, Fireworks, and Contribute. In 2003, Macromedia reduced the FreeHand development team to a few core members to produce the 11.0.2 update released in February 2004. The company released a final product suite prior to the 2005 merger with Adobe, called Studio 8, which was characterized by the absence of FreeHand from the suite's interactive online applications of Dreamweaver, Flash, Fireworks, Contribute, and FlashPaper.

=== Adobe FreeHand ===
On April 18, 2005, Adobe Systems announced an agreement to acquire Macromedia in a stock swap valued at about $3.4 billion. The Department of Justice regulated the transaction that came 10 years after the Federal Trade Commission's 1994 ruling which barred Adobe from acquiring FreeHand. The acquisition took place on December 3, 2005, and Adobe integrated the companies' operations, networks, and customer-care organizations shortly thereafter. Adobe acquired FreeHand along with the entire Macromedia product line that included Flash, Dreamweaver, and Fireworks, but not including Fontographer, which FontLab Ltd. had licensed with an option to buy all rights. Adobe's acquisition of Macromedia cast doubt on the future of FreeHand, primarily because of Adobe's competing product, Illustrator. Adobe announced in May 2006 that it planned to continue to support FreeHand and develop it "based on [their] customers' needs". One year later on May 15, 2007, Adobe said that it would discontinue development and updates to the program and the company would provide tools and support to ease the transition to Illustrator. In a 2008 interview with Senior Product Manager of Illustrator, Terry Hemphill, he told FreeHand users: "FreeHand is not going to be revived; time to move on, really. The Illustrator team is making a determined effort to bring the best of FreeHand into Illustrator, which should be evident from some of the new features in CS4."

== Controversy ==
In 2006, the FreeHand community protested Adobe's announcement of discontinuing development with the "FreeHand Support Page" petition. It was followed in 2007 by the "FreeHand Must Not Die" petition. In 2008, the Adobe FreeHand Forum listed, "Adobe latest FreeHand MX upgrade, Would you pay?" which continued to receive signatures in 2012. In February 2009, Creative Review magazine published ""Freehand Anonymous" about the present use of FreeHand in the UK. In September 2009, the Free FreeHand Organization (a user community with the goal of securing a future for FreeHand MX) was founded and by 2011, its membership had surpassed 6,000 members worldwide. In May 2011, the Free FreeHand Organization filed a civil antitrust complaint against Adobe Systems, Inc. alleging that "Adobe has violated federal and state antitrust laws by abusing its dominant position in the professional vector graphic illustration software market." In spite of the aforementioned petitions with the advent of Flash Player 11 in October 2011 Adobe intentionally ditched the support for SWF contents created in FreeHand supposedly aiming to urge the transition to its Illustrator software. Early 2012 the lawsuit initiated by Free FreeHand Organization resulted in a settlement with Adobe Systems, Inc., by which members of the group received discount to Adobe products and a promise for product development of Adobe Illustrator based on their requests.

== File formats ==
Adobe FreeHand file formats use filename extensions AGD and FHD; these should be able to be opened in the applications Collabora Online, LibreOffice or Apache OpenOffice, they can then be saved into the OpenDocument format or other file formats.

== Release history ==
Icon	Version	Company	Release year	Platforms	Notable Features (FreeHand firsts)
	FreeHand 1.0	Aldus	1988	Mac OS	Work in preview mode; Full support for CMYK process color and four-color separations
	FreeHand 2.0 (update: 2.0.2)	Aldus	1988	Mac OS	Editable blends.; TIFF import.; Custom fills and tiled fills.
	FreeHand 3.0 (update: 3.1.1)	Aldus	1991	Mac OS, Windows	Multiple pages in any sizes and orientation.
	FreeHand 4.0 (update: 4.0b)	Aldus	1994	Mac OS, NeXT a.k.a. "Virtuoso", Windows	A 54-inch square area for document pages, which fits 24 letter-sized pages with extra space for pasteboard items.; Wrap paragraphs within columns in tables. Auto-fit text to box.
	FreeHand 5.0 (updates: 5.0.2 and 5.5)	Macromedia	1995	Mac OS, Windows	Knife tool automatically closes the paths it cuts.; Copy and paste attributes from one object to another.; Objects can snap to Objects and guides.; A Perspective tool for objects.; Documents viewed in up to eight different windows.; Individual layers be viewed as Keyline or Preview.; Zoom up to 1,638,400%. Automatic trapping.; Eyedropper tool picks up colors from imported images.; Graduated and radial fills with up to 64 colors.; Version 5.5: (Mac only release): PDF Import; Accepts Photoshop plug-ins, to control scanners or apply filters to images.; Place drawn objects within text blocks so they flow with the text.; Export pages or objects as bitmap images.
	FreeHand 6.0	Macromedia	only existed in beta		
	FreeHand 7.0 (update: 7.0.2)	Macromedia	1996	Mac OS, Windows	Drag and drop between both FreeHand and Photoshop.; Blend between spot colors.; Blend between gradients.; Find and replace object attributes.; Export FreeHand to Shockwave (Flash).
	FreeHand 8.0 (update: 8.0.1b)	Macromedia	1998	Mac OS, Windows	Transparency in vector and bitmap objects.; Use Symbols for repeating elements.; Graphic Hose to spray symbols.; Reshape tool to push and pull paths; Assign keyboard shortcut to any command.; Drag and drop selections from Photoshop onto a FreeHand document.; Picture Usage dialog box; Collect for Output feature.; Magnify Lens to create a live, "zoomed" copy of any area.
	FreeHand 9.0 (updates: 9.0.1 Mac and 9.0.2 Win)	Macromedia	2000	Mac OS, Windows	Add hyperlinks to objects and export to PDF, HTML or Flash.; Export to Photoshop with layers intact.; Lasso tool to select freeform areas.; Magic Wand tool to select objects.; Envelope tool distorts graphics and editable text.; Perspective grids that reshape objects as you edit the grid.; Export multiple pages in HTML; Export layers and blends as Flash animation.; Convert a document to grayscale.
	FreeHand 10.0 (update: 10.0.1)	Macromedia	2001	Mac OS, Mac OS X, Windows	Master pages.; A Symbol library.; Print an area of a page.
	FreeHand 11.0 (MX) (updates: 11.0.1 and 11.0.2 in 2004)	Macromedia/Adobe	2003	Mac OS, Mac OS X, Windows	Extrude tool for 3D effects to objects.; Edit gradients directly within an object.; Item styles.; Connector Lines to link objects and move along with them.; Eraser tool to erase portions of vector objects.

== See also ==
- Comparison of vector graphics editors
