= Rob Burgess =

Canadian businessman (1957–2025)

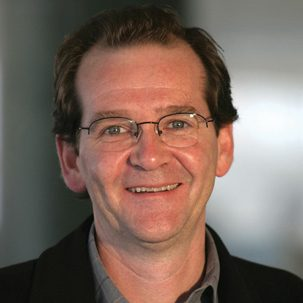
- Burgess in 2015
- Born: Robert Kenneth Burgess; August 29, 1957
- Died: December 21, 2025 (aged 68); Woodside, California, U.S.
- Education: McMaster University
- Known for: Former CEO of Macromedia and Alias Research
- Board member of: Alias Research 1991–1995; Macromedia 1996–2005; Adobe Systems 2005–2019; NVIDIA 2011–2025
- Spouse: Jane
- Children: 3

Robert Kenneth Burgess (August 29, 1957 – December 21, 2025) was a Canadian executive in the technology industry. He was the chief executive officer of Macromedia from 1996 to 2005 and chairman from 1997 to 2005. Prior to that, he was CEO of Alias Research from 1991 to 1995.

== Early life and education ==
Burgess grew up in Toronto, Canada and graduated from McMaster University with a bachelor of commerce degree in 1979. He was awarded the Wayne Fox distinguished alumni award from McMaster University's DeGroote School of Business in 2001, and in 2014 he received an honorary doctorate of laws.

== Career ==
From 1984 to 1991, Burgess worked in key executive posts at Silicon Graphics (SGI), a startup in the then emerging field of 3D computer graphics. He started as a sales engineer, opened up Silicon Graphics Canada, and ran that division until 1990 when he became vice president of applications and moved to Silicon Valley.

In 1991, Burgess returned to Toronto to become CEO of Alias Research, a 3D software company. Under his guidance the Alias team orchestrated a financial turnaround and became the leader in high end 3D software, and went on to develop Maya which emerged as the standard in computer animation software. On March 1, 2003, Alias was given an Academy Award for Technical Achievement by the Academy of Motion Picture Arts and Sciences for their development of Maya software.

In 1995, Alias was purchased by Silicon Graphics for $460 million, and Wavefront Technologies for $180 million. Burgess integrated Alias and Wavefront with Silicon Graphics and became president.

Burgess became the CEO and chairman of Macromedia in 1996. He held this position until 2005 when the company was sold to Adobe Systems for $4 billion, which was the fifth largest software acquisition at the time. Burgess joined the Adobe board at that time and served until 2019.

Under Burgess' tenure, he led Macromedia's transformation from a CD-ROM based multimedia company to become the market leader in computer animation and multimedia authoring for the internet. While he was chairman and CEO, the vector animation product Flash became the worldwide standard for multimedia authoring and playback and was available on 99% of "mature market" desktop web browsers by 2010.

Burgess also served on the board of directors of NVIDIA (NVDA), which he joined in 2011.

== Death ==
Burgess died in Woodside, California on December 21, 2025, at the age of 68.
