= Adobe Express =

Graphic design tool by Adobe Inc.

- Developer: Adobe
- Release: May 19, 2016; 10 years ago as Adobe Spark
- Operating system: Android; iOS; Web
- Website: adobe.com/express

Adobe Express, formerly Adobe Spark and later Creative Cloud Express, is a content creation tool developed by Adobe. It is a cloud-based design platform where users can create videos, PDF documents, web pages, graphics and other digital assets. It is aimed at mainstream users, not professional graphic designers.

== History ==
There were three mobile apps that were predecessors to Adobe Express, including Adobe Post for creating social media, Adobe Slate for creating magazine and photo album-style content, and Adobe Voice for combining voice recordings with illustrations. In 2016, Adobe unified these apps under the Adobe Spark name and added a web version. In 2021, the application was relaunched as Adobe Creative Cloud Express, which was renamed to Adobe Express. In 2023, Adobe launched Adobe Express for Enterprise, and later that year, incorporated generative artificial intelligence (AI) into the product.

In October 2022, Adobe announced a collaboration with Wix to extend Adobe Express capabilities to Wix users. Adobe has also partnered with several organizations and companies, including Etsy, Meta and Mastercard.

In May 2023, Google collaborated with Adobe to enable Gemini users to generate images via Adobe Firefly and then modify them using Express.
