= Adobe Firefly =

Image-generating machine learning model

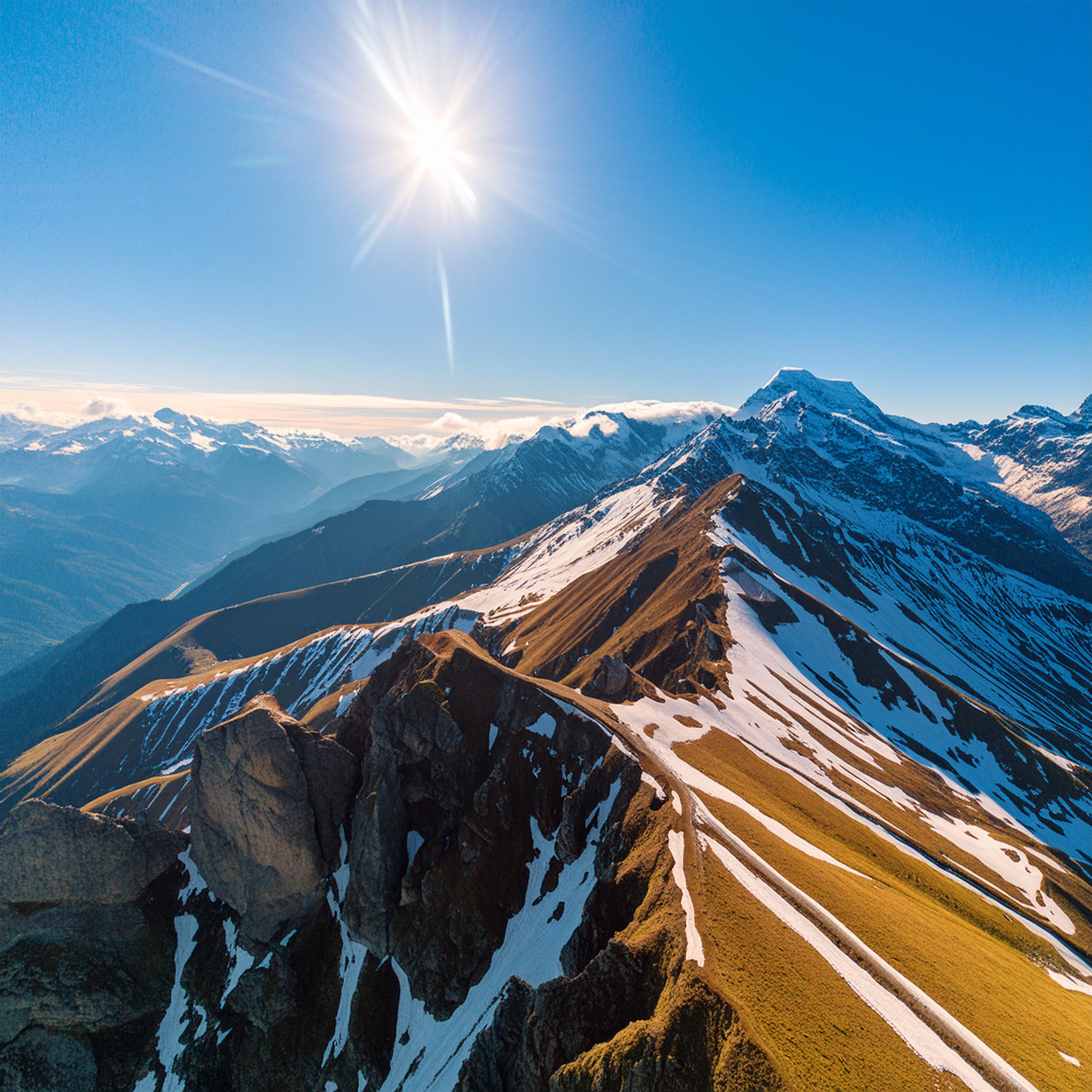
- An image generated with Adobe Firefly. Prompt: Paradise looking, but believable mountain landscape from drone perspective, sun is shining right over the edge of the highest mountain with snow on top
- Developer: Adobe
- Release: March 2023; 3 years ago (beta)
- Website: firefly.adobe.com

Adobe Firefly is a web app and set of generative artificial intelligence models for creative production offered by Adobe Inc.. Its capabilities include text-to-image and text-to-video, image-to-video, generate speech, generate soundtrack and, generate sound effects and alter speech.

It is part of Adobe Creative Cloud, and is used in other Creative Cloud apps, including Photoshop, Premiere Pro, and InDesign. Firefly is available via subscription plans that use monthly credits based on the type of AI being used.

Firefly is trained with images from Creative Commons, Wikimedia and Flickr Commons as well as 300 million images and videos in Adobe Stock and the public domain. Adobe has marketed Firefly's output as "commercially safe" due to the company's claims about the models' training data. In April 2024, Bloomberg reported that Firefly was also trained on Midjourney and other competitors' images, which Adobe had not clearly disclosed.

Firefly for Enterprise was released on June 22, 2023.

== History ==
Adobe Firefly was first announced in September 2022 at Adobe's MAX conference. It was initially released as a public beta in March 2023, before being made available to all Adobe Creative Cloud subscribers.

Adobe Firefly is part of Adobe Sensei, the company's AI platform.

In May 2023, Google announced plans to use Firefly in Bard (now Gemini) as its AI image generator, but ended up using their own Imagen model.

In April 2025, Adobe released Adobe Firefly Image 4 and Firefly Image 4 Ultra Model in Adobe Firefly Web Application.

In October 2025, Adobe Firefly released Image Model 5, Generate Soundtrack, Generate Speech, and Firefly Video Editor and announced them at the Adobe MAX conference.

== Capabilities ==
Firefly modalities, include text-to-speech, text-to-vector, image-to-video, video, image, audio, and music.

=== Integrations ===
Adobe Firefly is hosted partially from the Nvidia Picasso generative AI library.

Firefly and other Adobe products are integrated with Google’s AI models including Gemini, Veo and Imagen. Firefly is also equipped with AI models from OpenAI and ElevenLabs.

Adobe Firefly is used by Mattel to design packaging for all toys and subsidiaries, including Barbie. IBM and Dentsu also have integrations with Adobe Firefly.
