= Adobe Illustrator =

Vector graphics editor from Adobe Inc

- Adobe Illustrator 2025 running on Windows 10
- Developer: Adobe
- Release: March 19, 1987; 39 years ago
- Stable release: 30.8.1 / August 31, 2026; 2 months ago
- Written in: C++, ActionScript
- Operating system: Windows 10 v21H2 LTSC and v22H2 or Windows 11 v23H2 or later; macOS Ventura 13 or later; iPadOS 14 or later
- Type: Vector graphics editor
- License: Trialware, Proprietary, term
- Website: adobe.com/illustrator

Adobe Illustrator is a vector graphics editor and design software developed and marketed by Adobe. Originally designed for the Apple Macintosh, development of Adobe Illustrator began in 1985. Along with Creative Cloud (Adobe's shift to a monthly or annual subscription service delivered over the Internet), Illustrator CC was released. The latest version, Illustrator 2026, was released on October 28, 2025, and is the 30th generation in the product line. Adobe Illustrator was reviewed as the best vector graphics editing program in 2021 by PC Magazine.

== History ==
=== Versions 1–1.6 (Illustrator 88) ===
Development of Adobe Illustrator for the Apple Macintosh began in 1985 (shipping in January 1987) as Adobe's second software product after PostScript. Adobe co-founder and CEO John Warnock created Illustrator in late 1986 to automate many of the manual tasks utilized by his wife, Marva, a graphic designer. It used lines and bézier curves to render infinitely scalable graphics. Illustrator was released in early 1987, and became a commercialization of Adobe's in-house font development software and PostScript file format.

Adobe Illustrator is the companion product of Adobe Photoshop. Photoshop is primarily geared toward digital photo manipulation and photorealistic styles of computer illustration, while Illustrator provides results in the typesetting and logo graphic areas of design. Early magazine advertisements (featured in graphic design trade magazines such as Communication Arts) referred to the product as "the Adobe Illustrator". Illustrator 88, the product name for version 1.6, was released in 1988 and introduced many new tools and features.

Byte in 1989 listed Illustrator 88 as among the "Distinction" winners of the Byte Awards, stating that with it Adobe had "pulled ahead" of previously industry-dominant competitor Aldus FreeHand.

Early versions of the software did not support working in preview mode and users needed to have two windows open on their desktop in order to have a live preview of their work. One window would show the work in progress and the other window would show a preview of the work in progress.

=== Versions 2–6 ===
Although during its first decade Adobe developed Illustrator primarily for Macintosh, it sporadically supported other platforms. In the early 1990s, Adobe released versions of Illustrator for Display PostScript licensees NeXT, Digital Equipment Corporation Ultrix, Silicon Graphics IRIX, and Sun Solaris platforms, but they were discontinued due to poor market acceptance. The first version of Illustrator for Windows, version 2.0, was released in early 1989 and flopped. The next Windows version, version 4.0, was widely criticized as being too similar to Illustrator 1.1 instead of the Macintosh 3.0 version, and certainly not the equal of Windows' most popular illustration package CorelDRAW. (There were no versions 2.0 or 4.0 for the Macintosh—although, the second release for the Mac was titled Illustrator 88—the year of its release. And there was no version 6 for Windows.) Version 4 was, however, the first version of Illustrator to support editing in preview mode, which did not appear in a Macintosh version until 5.0 in 1993. Version 6 was the last truly Macintosh version of Illustrator. The interface changed radically with the following version to bring consistency between Mac and Windows computer platforms. The changes remained until CS6 when some small steps were taken to restore the app to a slightly more Mac-like interface.

=== Versions 7–10 ===
Adobe Illustrator 10, the last version before the Creative Suite rebrand

With the introduction of Illustrator 7 in 1997, Adobe made critical changes in the user interface with regard to path editing (and also to converge on the same user interface as Adobe Photoshop), and many users opted not to upgrade. Illustrator also began to support TrueType, effectively ending the "font wars" between PostScript Type 1 and TrueType. Like Photoshop, Illustrator also began supporting plug-ins, greatly and quickly extending its abilities.

With true user interface parity between Macintosh and Windows versions starting with 7.0, designers could finally standardize on Illustrator. Corel did port CorelDRAW 6.0 to the Macintosh in late 1996, but it was received as too little, too late. Designers tended to prefer Illustrator, CorelDraw, or FreeHand, based on which software they learned first. As an example, there are capabilities in FreeHand still not available in Illustrator (higher scaling percentages, advanced find-and-replace feature, selective round-corner editing, export/print selected objects only, etc.). Famously, Aldus made a matrix comparing its own FreeHand to Illustrator and CorelDraw in which CorelDraw's one "win" was that it came with three different clip art views of the human pancreas.

Adobe bought Aldus in 1994 for PageMaker. As part of the transaction, the Federal Trade Commission issued a complaint of Adobe Systems on October 18, 1994, ordering a divestiture of FreeHand to "remedy the lessening of competition resulting from the acquisition" because of Adobe's Illustrator software. As a result, Macromedia acquired FreeHand in 1995 from its original developer, Altsys, and continued its development through 2004.

The difference in strengths between Photoshop and Illustrator became clear with the rise of the Internet, Illustrator was enhanced to support Web publishing, rasterization previewing, PDF, and SVG (Scalable Vector Graphics). Adobe was an early developer of SVG for the web and Illustrator exported SVG files via the SVG File Format plugin. Using the Adobe SVG Viewer (ASV), introduced in 2000, allowed users to view SVG images in most major browsers until it was discontinued in 2009. Native support for SVG was not complete in all major browsers until Internet Explorer 9 in 2011.

Illustrator Version 9 included a tracing feature, similar to that within Adobe's discontinued product Streamline.

Illustrator version 10 was released by Adobe in November 2001.

=== Versions CS–CS6 ===
Illustrator CS (also called version 11), released by Adobe for Mac and Windows in October 2003, was the first version to include 3-dimensional capabilities allowing users to extrude or revolve shapes to create simple 3D objects.

Illustrator CS2 (version 12), released by Adobe in April 2005, was available for both the Mac OS X and Microsoft Windows operating systems. It was the last version for the Mac which did not run natively on Intel processors. Among the new features included in Illustrator CS2 were Live Trace, Live Paint, a control palette and custom workspace. Live Trace allows for the conversion of bitmap imagery into vector art and improved upon the previous tracing abilities. Live Paint allows users more flexibility in applying color to objects, specifically those that overlap. In the same year as the CS2 release, Adobe Systems announced an agreement to acquire Macromedia in a stock swap valued at about $3.4 billion and it integrated the companies' operations, networks, and customer-care organizations shortly thereafter. Adobe now owned FreeHand along with the entire Macromedia product line and in 2007, Adobe announced that it would discontinue development and updates to the FreeHand program. Instead, Adobe would provide tools and support to ease the transition to Illustrator.

Illustrator CS3 included interface updates to the Control Bar, the ability to align individual points, multiple Crop Areas, the Color Guide panel and the Live Color feature among others. CS3 was released on March 27, 2007.

CS4 was released in October 2008. It features a variety of improvements to old tools along with the introduction of a few brand-new tools acquired from FreeHand. The ability to create multiple artboards is one of CS4's main additions from FreeHand. The artboards allow you to create multiple versions of a piece of work within a single document. Other tools include the Blob Brush, which allows multiple overlapping vector brush strokes to easily merge or join, and a revamped gradient tool allowing for more in-depth color manipulation as well as transparency in gradients.

CS5 was released in April 2010. Along with a number of enhancements to existing functionality, Illustrator CS5's new features include a Perspective Grid tool taken from FreeHand, a Bristle Brush (for more natural and painterly looking strokes) and a comprehensive update to strokes, referred to by Adobe as "Beautiful Strokes".

In 2011 the Adobe Illustrator team developed a vector drawing app for iPad and iPhone, called Adobe Ideas. The app had many of the features of Adobe Illustrator, yet it was a free download. This allowed professionals to sketch and ideate "on the go" and allowed anyone to access world-class vector drawing capabilities. As a result, Facebook and social media posts appeared from all over the world with vector drawings from Adobe Ideas from pros and novices alike.

Version CS6 was the 16th generation of Adobe Illustrator. Adobe added many more features and several bug fixes such as a new user interface, layer panels, RGB codes, and color ramp to increase performance. CS6 was released on April 23, 2012.

=== Version CC ===
Along with Creative Cloud (the result of Adobe's shift on its release strategy), Illustrator CC was released. This version (the 17th) was the first to be only sold in a subscription-based service model, in line with the other software in the formerly called Creative Suite. As part of Creative Cloud, this version brought improvements in that subject such as color, font and program settings syncing, saving documents to the cloud, and integration with Behance (a creative collaborative network), as well as other features such as a new touch-compatible type tool, images in brushes, CSS extraction, and files packaging.

== Branding ==
Starting with version 1.0, Adobe chose to license an image of Sandro Botticelli's "The Birth of Venus" from the Bettmann Archive and use the portion containing Venus' face as Illustrator's branding image. John Warnock desired a Renaissance image to evoke his vision of PostScript as a new Renaissance in publishing, and Adobe employee Luanne Seymour Cohen, who was responsible for the early marketing material, found Venus' flowing tresses a perfect vehicle for demonstrating Illustrator's strength in tracing smooth curves over bitmap source images. Over the years the rendition of this image on Illustrator's splash screen and packaging became more stylized to reflect features added in each version.

The image of Venus was replaced (albeit still accessible via easter egg) in Illustrator CS (11.0) and CS2 (12.0) by a stylized flower to conform to the Creative Suite's nature imagery. In CS3, Adobe changed the suite branding once again, to simple colored blocks with two-letter abbreviations, resembling a periodic table of elements. Illustrator was represented by the letters Ai in white against an orange background (oranges and yellows were prominent color schemes in Illustrator branding going back as far as version 4.0). The CS4 icon is almost identical, except for a slight alteration to the font and the color which is dark gray. The CS5 icon is also virtually the same, except that this time the logo is like a box, along with all the other CS5 product logos, with the "Ai" bright yellow. CS6 changed it a bit to a brown square with a yellow border and yellow lettering, and in CC 2014 the colors were upgraded to a sharper tone and thinner borders.

== Compatibility with Inkscape ==
While Inkscape's native format, SVG (Scalable Vector Graphics), is supported by Adobe Illustrator, the two implementations are not fully compatible. Inkscape also exports to PS, EPS and PDF formats which Illustrator can recognize.

== Tools ==
A sidebar that appears at the left of the screen with a variety of tools to select, create, and manipulate objects or artworks in Illustrator. These tools can be selected as following: drawing, typing, painting, reshaping, slicing and cutting, symbolism, moving and zooming, and graph. Some tools have a small triangle at the bottom right of the toolbox icon. A small triangle has the option to view or expand some hidden tools by holding down the mouse button on the triangle.

Some examples of basic tools in Illustrator are selection tools, paintbrush tools, pen tools, pencil tools e.g. Selection tools are used to the layout, adjust, and organize the artwork by selecting, positioning, and stacking objects accurately. Moreover, selection tools can group, lock or hide, and measure objects. Paintbrush tools can be used to modify the appearance of the artwork. There are different types of brushes: calligraphic, scatter, art, pattern, and bristle. Pen tools create straight and curved lines for the artwork and they can add anchor points to paths and delete from paths. Pencil tools allow the user to draw and edit freehand lines.

== File formats ==
The Adobe Illustrator Artwork format is the native Illustrator file format.

It is a proprietary file format developed by Adobe Systems for representing single-page vector-based drawings in either the EPS or PDF formats. The .ai filename extension is used by Adobe Illustrator.

The AI file format was originally a native format called PGF. This format is not related to .pgf using the same name Progressive Graphics Format.

PDF compatibility is achieved by embedding a complete copy of the PGF data within the saved PDF format file. The same "dual path" approach as for PGF is used when saving EPS-compatible files in recent versions of Illustrator. Early versions of the AI file format are true EPS files with a restricted, compact syntax, with additional semantics represented by Illustrator-specific DSC comments that conform to DSC's Open Structuring Conventions. These files are identical to their corresponding Illustrator EPS counterparts, but with the EPS procsets (procedure sets) omitted from the file and instead externally referenced using %%Include directives.

The following formats are also supported:

- SVG format
- AutoCAD file formats — Implemented by Drawings SDK (previously Teigha Drawings) by Open Design Alliance.
  - AutoCAD Drawing (.dwg)
  - AutoCAD Interchange File (.dxf)

== Illustrator Draw ==
Illustrator Draw was a free-form vector drawing app for Android and iOS users. Along with Illustrator, it is currently marketed by Adobe through Creative Cloud. Drawings made with the Illustrator Draw app can be exported to the desktop programs of Adobe Illustrator.

As of 2022, Illustrator Draw is retired and replaced by Adobe Fresco, which is only available on iOS and Windows.

== Release history ==
Release history of Adobe Illustrator, sorted by version number
Version	Platforms	Release date	Code name	Notable features
1.0	Classic Mac OS	January 1987	Picasso	
1.1	Classic Mac OS	March 19, 1987	Inca	
88	Classic Mac OS	March 1988		
2.0	Windows	January 1989	Pinnacle	
3	Classic Mac OS, NeXT, other Unixes	October 1990	Desert Moose	
3.5	IRIX	1991		
4	Windows	May 1992	Kangaroose	
3.5	Solaris	1993		
5	Classic Mac OS	June 1993	Saturn	Graph creation, layers, live editing in preview mode
5.5	Classic Mac OS, Solaris	June 1994	Janus	Spell checker, find/replace text function
5.5.1	IRIX	1995		
6	Classic Mac OS	February 1996	Popeye	Gradients, eye dropper, paint bucket
5.1	Windows	1996	Pavel	
7	Mac/Windows	May 1997	Simba	Tabbed dockable palettes, transform palette, align palette, Photoshop pixel filters, rasterize, punk, bloat, free distort, layout grid, vertical text tool, reshape tool
8	Mac/Windows	September 1998	Elvis	Pencil tool, bounding box handles, smart guides, actions palette, bitmap eyedropper, gradient mesh, live brushes, links palette
9	Mac/Windows	June 2000	Matisse	Flash & SVG output, pixel preview, release to layers, drop shadows, transparency, feathering, opacity & layer mask, native PDF support
10	Mac/Windows	November 2001	Paloma	Live pathfinder shapes, symbols, slicing, css layer support, ODBC data link, variables palette, save for web, live distortion, warping, envelopes (warp/mesh/top object), liquify tools, grid/line/arc/polar grid tools, flare tool, magic wand
CS (11)	Mac/Windows	October 2003	Pangaea/Sprinkles	3D effect, OpenType support, character & paragraph styles, template file format, scribble effect, columns & rows, optical kerning, optical margins, every-line composer, custom tab leaders, WYSIWYG font menu, Japanese type support, path type option, save for Microsoft Office
CS2 (12, 12.0.1)	Mac/Windows	April 27, 2005	Zodiac	Live trace, live paint, colorized grayscale, Photoshop layer support, expanded stroke options, control palette, Adobe Bridge support, Wacom tablet support, SVG-t export, PDF/X export, released with an official serial number because of the technical glitch on Adobe's CS2 activation servers as of January 2013 (see Creative Suite 1 & 2)
CS3 (13)	Mac/Windows	April 2007	Jason	Live color, Flash integration, eraser tool, document profiles, crop area, isolation mode
CS4 (14)	Mac/Windows	October 2008	Sonnet	Multiple artboards, transparency in gradients, blob brush, live gradient editing, separations previews, in-palette appearance editing
CS5 (15, 15.0.1, 15.0.2)	Mac/Windows	May 2010	Ajanta	Perspective drawing tools, variable-width strokes, control over opacity in points on gradient meshes, shape builder tool (similar to pathfinder tools) and a bristle brush, which enables users to imitate real life brush strokes while maintaining vector format.
CS6 (16, 16.0.2)	Mac/Windows	May 2012	Ellora	Adobe Mercury Performance System, 64-bit memory support, new user interface, gradient on a stroke, pattern creator tool, ImageTrace (replaces Live Trace)
CC (17)	Mac/Windows	June 17, 2013		Deeper Creative Cloud integration (font, color palette and settings syncing, Behance integration), new typing capabilities, multiple file place, images in brushes, CSS extraction
CC (17.1)	Mac/Windows	January 16, 2014		Live Corners, updated pencil, path reshaping, Typekit integration, custom tool panels
CC 2014 (18.0)	Mac/Windows	June 18, 2014		Live Rectangles, pen rubberband, bezier handles no longer grid-snap, Windows GPU performance
CC 2014 (18.1)	Mac/Windows	October 6, 2014		CC Libraries, Touch Workspace, Curvature tool, Join tool, auto type area resizing
CC 2015 (19.0.0)	Mac/Windows	June 16, 2015		Linked assets in Libraries, Adobe Stock integration, Faster [zoom/pan/scroll], Safe mode, file data recovery, GPU performance, tool and workspace enhancements, Charts preview
CC 2015.1 (19.1.0)	Mac/Windows	July 25, 2015		Stability fixes
CC 2015.2 (19.2.0)	Mac/Windows	November 30, 2015		Enhanced Creative Cloud Libraries, Shaper tool, new Live Shapes, Dynamic Symbols, enhanced Smart Guides, new SVG Export options, Touch Workspace enhancements, Charts removed
CC 2015.3 (20.0)	Mac/Windows	June 20, 2016		Updated and better collaboration with libraries, Work more efficiently with Adobe Stock, Live shapes and transform panel updates, Adobe Experience Design CC (Preview) integration, fast export of assets and Artboards
CC 2015.3.1 (20.1)	Mac/Windows	August 10, 2016		New search for Adobe Stock assets
CC 2017 (21.0.0)	Mac/Windows	November 2, 2016		Improved alignment tools, find fonts faster, work easier with glyphs, easy access to templates including free Adobe Stock templates, archive and restore all your assets stored in Creative Cloud, introducing Typekit Marketplace, see a live preview by hovering over the font list with selected text, zoom to selection, flat UI and new icons
CC 2017.0.1 (21.0.1)	Mac/Windows	January 9, 2017		Stability fixes
CC 2017.0.2	Mac/Windows	January 15, 2017		Stability fixes
CC 2017.1 (21.1.0)	Mac/Windows	April 5, 2017		Bitmap cropping added; start screen loads faster; color theme panel redesigned; stability enhancements
CC 2018 (22.0.0)	Mac/Windows	October 18, 2017		Properties panel; Puppet Warp; 1000 artboards; Variable and SVG color font support; MacBook touchbar support
CC 2018 (22.1.0)	Mac/Windows	March 13, 2018		Increased anchor point and handle sizes; import multi-page PDF files; support for CSV data source files; live SVG paste; locked items do not move with artboards by default
CC 2019 (23.0.0)	Mac/Windows	October 15, 2018		Freeform Gradients; Global Edit; Trim View; Scalable UI; customizable toolbars; Content-Aware Crop; Presentation Mode; enhanced visual font browsing; external GPU support; stability enhancements.
2019 (23.0.2)	Mac/Windows	February 8, 2019		Lock for the New Customizable Toolbar; Rotate dialogue box does have default focus on the rotate input widget; constraint angle with the Shift key to draw linear and radial gradients; stability enhancements.
2019 (23.1.0)	Mac/Windows	September 18, 2019		Improved path simplification; faster drop shadow, inner/outer glow, and Gaussian blur effects; improved file save/open on networks and removable media; Performance improvements.
2020 (24.0)	Mac/Windows	October 24, 2019		Improved File Handling; Improved UI; Background File Saving; faster rendering of effects and live previews; more efficient path simplification; spell check; Performance improvements.
2020 (24.0.2)	Mac/Windows	December 2019		New Reset Preferences option; faster file saving.
2020 (24.1)	Mac/Windows	March 6, 2020		Real-time drawing; Cut and Copy artboards; enhanced free distort; stability enhancements.
2020 (24.2)	Mac/Windows	June 16, 2020		Cloud documents; 100x canvas; faster New Document window and faster saving for cloud documents.
2020 (24.3)	Mac/Windows	August 2020		Snap to glyph, Align text vertically, Font height variations, Align to glyph bounds, Unlock objects on canvas.
2021 (25.0)	Mac/Windows	October 2020		Recolor artwork, enhanced cloud documents, Metal GPU rendering; repeat objects (read-only support)
2021 (25.1)	Mac/Windows	January 2021		Repeat objects (radial, grid, and mirror)
2021 (25.2)	Mac/Windows	February 2021		Share access and edit Illustrator cloud documents, snap to Japanese glyph, system compatibility report on app launch, performance improvements.
2021 (25.3)	Mac/Windows	June 2021		Rotate view, Apple M1 native, paste test without source formatting, delete hidden layers.
2022 (26.0)	Mac/Windows	October 2021		3D and materials, share for commenting, simplified variable width strokes, text attributes in Select Same, HEIF/WebP support, Auto-font activation.
2022 (26.1)	Mac/Windows	February 28, 2022		3D improvements, bug fixes.
2022 (26.2)	Mac/Windows	March 2022		Map artwork over 3D objects using graphics, bug fixes (including blue/white canvas on selection bug).
2022 (26.3)	Mac/Windows	May 10, 2022		3D Perspective Camera, drag and drop graphics to 3D panel, AVIF format support, automatic file backup.
2022 (26.4)	Mac/Windows	July 25, 2022		History Panel, bullets and numbering formatting, 3D improvements. Final version to include built-in support for complete Pantone color books.
2022 (26.5)	Mac/Windows	August 25, 2022		Warnings for Pantone colors and Type 1 fonts.
2023 (27.0)	Mac/Windows	October 18, 2022		Intertwine, Quick Actions, Share for review (Beta), pasting text from Illustrator to InDesign retains formatting, Actions panel reformatted, additional 3D object export formats
2023 (27.1)	Mac/Windows	December 6, 2022		Taper and twist 3D objects, Image Trace enhancements, preview color/opacity in real-time, convert bullets and numbering to editable text, bug fixes
2023 (27.2)	Mac/Windows	January 2023		Stability fixes
2023 (27.3)	Mac/Windows	February 2023		Easier Intertwine selection areas; Image Trace improvements; 3D improvements; Type 1 font EOL; Reuse asset export settings; stability fixes
2023 (27.4)	Mac/Windows	March 2023		Share for Review improvements
2023 (27.5)	Mac/Windows	April 21, 2023		Performance improvements to Smart Guides and Live Editing
2023 (27.6)	Mac/Windows	May 2023		Generative AI recoloring (beta); Retype font identification (beta); Image Trace improvements; search & filter Layers; export as WebP; retain hyperlinks in exported PDFs
2023 (27.7)	Mac/Windows	June 2023		Search & filter Layers enhancements; screen reader support for toolbar drawer
2023 (27.8.1)	Mac/Windows	July 2023		Gather feedback on specific artboards; Experience improved accessibility with VoiceOver (macOS only)
2023 (27.9)	Mac/Windows	September 2023		Generative Recolor now in 100 languages and commercial use; enhancements to Retype (beta)
2024 (28.0)	Mac/Windows	October 10, 2023		Text to Vector Graphics (beta) with generative AI; Mockup (beta) of art on objects; edit text within images with Retype (beta); Smooth slider
2024 (28.1)	Mac/Windows	December 8, 2023		Measure and plot dimensions with Dimension tool (beta); unembed multiple images; Links panel adds Delete button
2024 (28.2)	Mac/Windows	January 2024		Text to Vector Graphic enhancements
2024 (28.3)	Mac/Windows	February 2024		Dimension tool enhancements; Live Star shape; Retype enhancements; pinnable contextual task bar; enclosing mode for marquee selection; keyboard shortcuts for text formatting (bold, italic, underline)
2024 (28.4)	Mac/Windows	March 2024		Text to Vector Graphic enhancements; Retype enhancements; improved pan & zoom)
2024 (28.5)	Mac/Windows	May 3, 2024		Relink missing files automatically, Sort linked files by size & Move Illustrator files between systems seamlessly
2024 (28.6)	Mac/Windows	July 23, 2024		
2025 (29.0)	Mac/Windows	October 14, 2024		
2025 (29.5.1)	Mac/Windows	April 2025		Ideate and fill shapes with vector graphics, Make patterns in unique arrangements, Create crisper scenes, subjects, and icons
2025 (29.7)	Mac/Windows	August 4, 2025		Improved artboard management, a “Recent Colors” palette, easier gradient use, a searchable Preferences panel, and enhanced accessibility features.
2026 (30.0)	Mac/Windows	October 27, 2025		
2026 (30.1)	Mac/Windows	December, 2025		The update fixes issues where stroke widths changed scaling despite “Scale Strokes & Effects” being off, restores missing format options in “Export for Screens,” and resolves a bug that caused perceptual gradient artwork to export to PDF at 72 dpi instead of the intended resolution.
2026 (30.2)	Mac/Windows	February, 2025		
2026 (30.3)	Mac/Windows	March 30, 2025		
2026 (30.4)	Mac/Windows	May 13, 2026		

== See also ==
- Comparison of vector graphics editors
- Inkscape
- Krita
- Bézier curve
- Vector graphics
- Scalable Vector Graphics
