= Ed Colligan =

American businessman

- Born: March 4, 1961 (age 65)
- Education: University of Oregon
- Known for: Former president and CEO of Palm, Inc.

Edward "Ed" Colligan (born March 4, 1961) is a former president and CEO of Palm, Inc. which was acquired by Hewlett-Packard in 2010. Colligan now is a small business investor, serves on a number of boards, and advises start-up companies.

== Education and career ==
Colligan graduated in 1983 with a bachelor's degree in political science from the University of Oregon. Earlier in his career, he served as vice president of strategic and product marketing for Radius Corporation.

Colligan was president and COO of Handspring prior to the Palm/Handspring merger in 2003. Before Handspring, he led the marketing campaign at Palm, Inc. that launched the Palm family of PDAs and smartphones.

In March 2022, Colligan joined the renewable energy asset management company Low Carbon as Head of Americas. Colligan also joined the board of directors.

== Personal life ==
Colligan and his wife/partner Bobbi Burns are co-founders of Central Coast Angels (CCA), an angel group providing early-stage financing to innovative companies located in the California Central Coast region. Colligan's eldest brother John "Bud" Colligan was a co-founder, CEO, and chairman of Macromedia.
