= Adobe MAX =

Annual conference held by Adobe

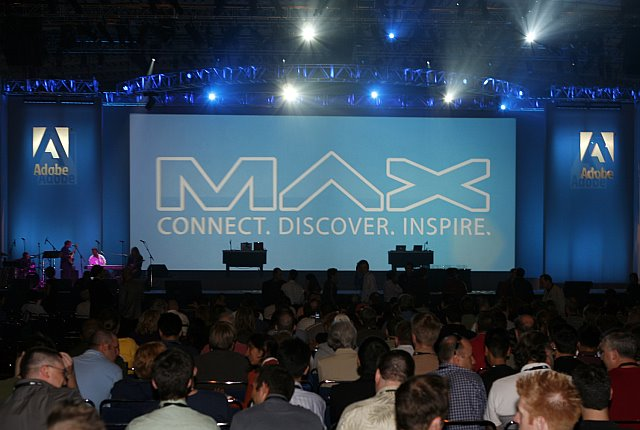
- Adobe MAX 2007, McCormick Place
- Genre: Creativity conference
- Frequency: Annually
- Country: United States
- Inaugurated: 2003
- Organiser: Adobe Inc.
- People: 12,000 (2017)
- Website: max.adobe.com

Adobe MAX is an annual creativity conference held by Adobe Inc. The event helps Adobe to present the new developments of its suite of applications and to build a community of creative professionals.

== History ==
The first MAX conference was held by Macromedia in November 2003 in Salt Lake City, Utah. It combined the elements of its previous DevCon conference for web designers and developers and the UCON conference, which targeted software users. The MAX aimed to help developers and designers to learn about new products, showcased technological advances, and included a talent show and an award. Tech support labs, workshops, cyber cafes, and special events took place at the MAX.

After Adobe's acquisition of Macromedia in 2005, the conference was rebranded as Adobe MAX and shifted focus from developers and coders to creatives. Adobe integrated sessions for Photoshop, InDesign, and other products. In 2013, the conference was finally rebadged as the creativity conference and moved away from being a developer event.

Over the years, Adobe MAX took place in New Orleans, Salt Lake City, San Diego, Las Vegas, Chicago, and Anaheim. In the 2010s, it was mostly held in Los Angeles. By 2017, the number of in-person attendees reached 12,000. Due to the COVID-19 pandemic, in 2020, Adobe MAX was an online-only event with free access to all content. In 2021, the virtual conference gathered 2.2 million website visits, 21 million video views, and 50 million social interactions. In 2022, the event took place both online and physically in LA.

== Events ==
Adobe MAX aims to teach creative professionals about Adobe products, and demonstrates the latest updates of its suite of applications, and the vision for future development. Traditionally, the major announcements are kept for the MAX. During the keynote presentations, Adobe announces new products and features to be released on the day of the event or in the near future. At the Sneaks events, Adobe engineers show some of the features they work on for different Adobe products. Hundreds of sessions teach attendees the basics or new tips and tricks of using the Adobe suite in different creative industries. MAX Bash is a massive party containing a number of other entertainment events and a concert.

Adobe MAX covers the topics of graphic design, illustration, videography, photography, UI/UX, 3D art, augmented reality, social media, creativity and design, collaboration and productivity, and education. The 2021 Adobe Max offered 400 sessions, labs, workshops, and networking events, as well as community challenges.

== Locations ==
- 2026: Miami, FL
- 2025: Los Angeles, CA
- 2024: Miami, FL
- 2022–2023: Los Angeles, CA
- 2021: Online
- 2020: Online
- 2018–2019: Los Angeles, CA
- 2017: Las Vegas, NV
- 2016: San Diego, CA
- 2009–2015: Los Angeles, CA
- 2008: San Francisco, CA
- 2007: Chicago, IL
- 2006: Las Vegas, NV
- 2005: Anaheim, CA (Macromedia/Adobe MAX)
- 2004: New Orleans, LA (Macromedia MAX)
- 2003: Salt Lake City, UT (Macromedia MAX)

== See also ==
- List of computer-related awards
