= Michael W. Allen =

American software developer, educator, and author

Michael W Allen
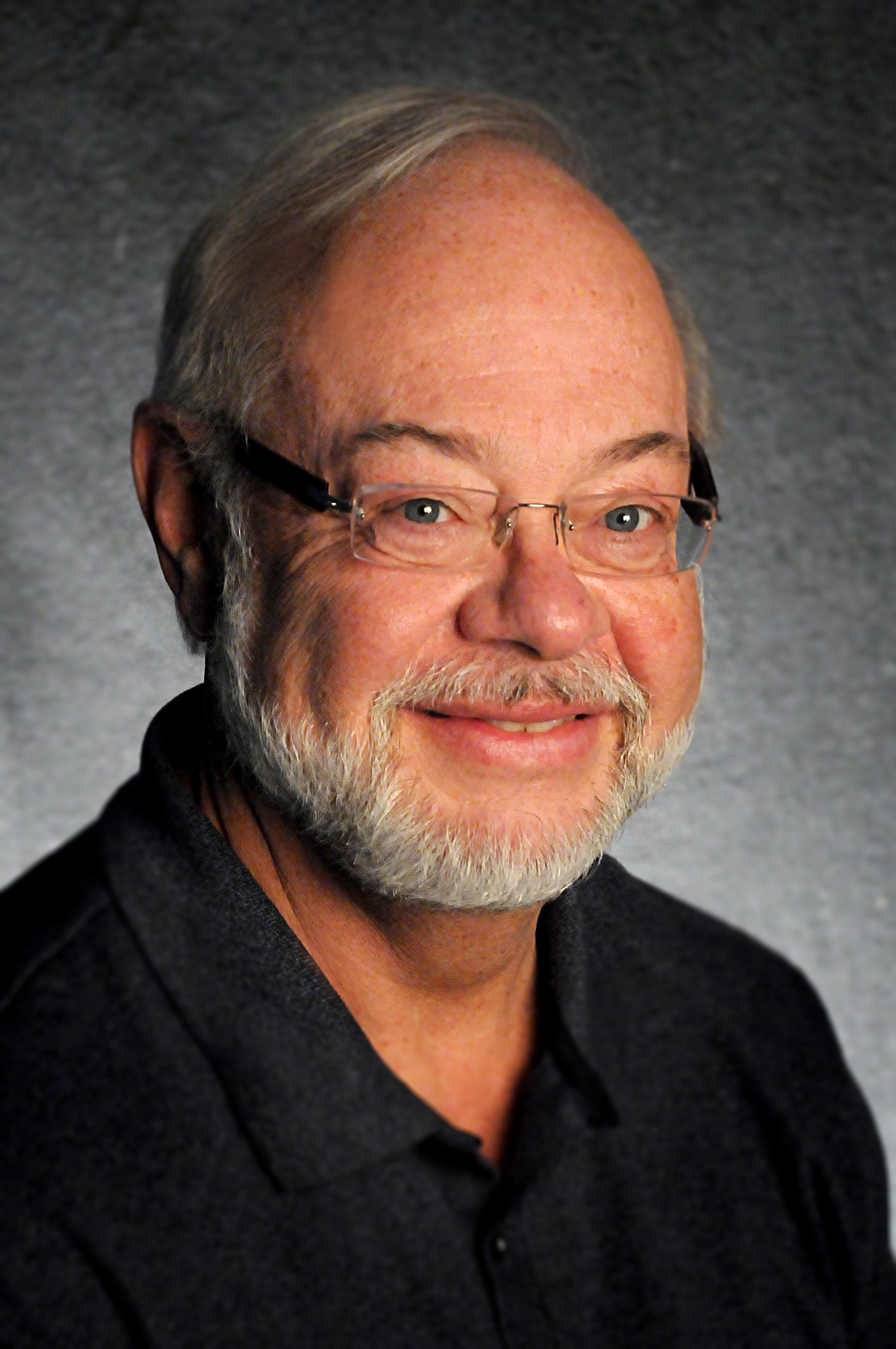
- Michael W. Allen in 2009
- Born: 1946 (age 79–80)
- Known for: e-learning
- Website: www.alleninteractions.com

Michael W. Allen (born 1946) is an American software developer, educator, and author. He is known for his work on e-learning, and led the development of the Authorware software.

== Biography ==
Allen received a BA in psychology from Cornell College, and MA and Ph.D. from the Ohio State University in educational psychology. From 1971 to 1984 Allen worked for Control Data Corporation on its PLATO computer-based education system . He rose to be director of advanced educational systems R&D. Allen founded Authorware in 1984, incorporating it in 1985. Authorware merged with MacroMind-Paracomp in 1992 to form Macromedia, which was later bought by Adobe Systems.

Allen formed a spinoff of the professional services division of Authorware called MediaPros, which was acquired by Lifetouch, Inc. a year later.

He founded Allen Interactions, Inc. in 1993, acting as chairman and Chief Executive Officer. The company designs custom interactive e-learning applications and provides consulting and training services.

He founded Allen Learning Technologies in 2010 and serves as chairman and chief executive officer. The company announced project Zebra in 2010, a new e-learning authoring system.

He is associated with the University of Minnesota School of Public Health as an adjunct associate professor in the Department of Family Medicine and Community Health. He consulted on a study that used e-learning to reduce the spread of HIV.

Allen is the author of several books, most notable being Michael Allen's Guide to e-Learning, and is editor of Michael Allen's e-Learning Annual, first published in February 2008. In May 2011 the American Society for Training & Development presented him a distinguished contribution award.

Allen was a 2012 Ellis Island Medal of Honor Recipient by the National Ethnic Coalition of Organizations.

== Books ==
- Michael Allen's Guide to e-Learning. Wiley. 2002. ISBN 978-0-471-20302-5.
- Creating Successful E-Learning : A Rapid System For Getting It Right First Time, Every Time. Pfeiffer. 2006. ISBN 978-0-7879-8300-0.
- Designing Successful e-Learning, Michael Allen's Online Learning Library: Forget What You Know About Instructional Design and Do Something Interesting. Pfeiffer. 2007. ISBN 978-0-7879-8299-7.
- Successful e-Learning Interface: Making Learning Technology Polite, Effective, and Fun. Pfeiffer. 2011. ISBN 978-0-7879-8297-3.
- Michael Allen's 2008 e-Learning Annual. Pfeiffer. 2008. ISBN 978-0-7879-8743-5.
- Michael Allen's 2009 e-Learning Annual. Pfeiffer. 2009. ISBN 978-0-470-37145-9.
- Michael Allen's 2012 e-Learning Annual. Pfeiffer. 2011. ISBN 978-0-470-91382-6.
- Leaving ADDIE for SAM: An Agile Model for Developing the Best Learning Experiences. ASTD Press. 2012. ISBN 978-1-56286-711-9.
