= Macromedia Central =

- Stable release: 1.5 / September 2004
- Website: www.adobe.com/products/central

Macromedia Central was a runtime environment developed by Macromedia (now just Adobe since being acquired) for developing application software that runs on different operating systems and are distributed over the Internet.

It is an extension of the Adobe Flash Player, and shares some similarities with the Java Runtime Environment, although it has a much smaller memory footprint and is more suited for vector animation.

Macromedia Central's newest version is currently 1.5, released in September 2004.

With the release of Adobe AIR beta, Central became obsolete and is no longer available for download. However, the SWF file that allows Central installation is available here.

== Easter egg ==
A hidden Homestar Runner cartoon could be found in Macromedia Central by opening the "About Macromedia Central" dialog box, holding down Ctrl (or command on Macintoshes) and double-clicking on the logo. This brings up a password entry box. Enter "sbemail" as the password, and the cartoon will play in the dialog box. For more information, see the Homestar Runner Wiki's article on the cartoon.
