= Macromedia xRes =

Image editing software by Fauve Software

- Macromedia xRes Icon
- Developer: Macromedia
- Stable release: 3.0 / 1997; 29 years ago
- Operating system: Microsoft Windows; Classic Mac OS
- Type: Raster Graphics Editor
- Website: Official Website Closed or Unavailable.

xRes was an image editing application by Fauve Software, later acquired by Macromedia. It allowed for a real time preview of work. An early version also introduced the concept of layers, a new way of moving and overlapping objects within an image. It was available for older versions of Mac OS and Windows.

== History ==
xRes was originally released by Fauve Software Inc., based on their earlier Fauve Matisse software – this latter was the earliest consumer software introduced in North America to use layers, preceding their implementation in Adobe Photoshop 3.0 in 1994. LALF introduced Layers to the Japanese market in 1989. Fauve was purchased by Macromedia, who rebranded the software as Macromedia Matisse and Macromedia xRes, and who then released xRes 2.0.

== Features ==
The main feature promoted by Macromedia was the ability of xRes to process files much larger than could be handled in memory (called 'xRes Mode'). It accomplished this by performing user interactions on temporary copies of the original file at the resolution and region of the image that was being displayed on the user's screen. This resulted in only a fraction of the memory use and faster interaction. The biggest downside to this approach was that once all editing was done, the user's edits needed to be applied to the original high resolution file, which could take some time to process.

xRes continued until version 3.0, when the project was cancelled. It couldn't sustainably compete with the newer versions of Photoshop. Macromedia required a faster release cycle, and it would have taken too much time to develop it to the stage where it could compete. At this point, three of the main programmers left the company. Once they were replaced, Macromedia's focus had changed so much that xRes was discontinued.
