= FlashPaper =

Macromedia FlashPaper
- Developers: Adobe Systems (formerly Macromedia and Blue Pacific Software)
- Final release: 2.02.2302.0 / October 19, 2005; 20 years ago
- Operating system: Microsoft Windows, Mac OS X
- Available in: English
- Type: Multimedia Content Creator
- License: Proprietary
- Website: www.adobe.com/products/flashpaper/

FlashPaper (originally known as Flash Printer) was a software application developed by Blue Pacific Software before its acquisition by Macromedia, which was later acquired by Adobe Systems. Its functional design mimics Adobe Acrobat Distiller to behave as a virtual printer. Documents printed to FlashPaper can be printed as Adobe Flash or Adobe Portable Document Format (PDF) files. Macromedia first incorporated FlashPaper with version 2 of their Contribute HTML editor. For a time in the mid-2000s, it was more accessible than Adobe's own Acrobat Reader for viewing documents on the web.

Adobe announced it was discontinuing development of FlashPaper on September 4, 2008. The company states that "the demand [for FlashPaper] has continually declined to where it is no longer economically viable for Adobe to continue development support for FlashPaper" but noted that it would continue selling and supporting the existing version of FlashPaper. It was last included in Macromedia Studio 8, and was available for a time as a standalone product from Adobe. FlashPaper files can be also generated by ColdFusion web applications.
