= Bud Colligan =

American businessman and activist

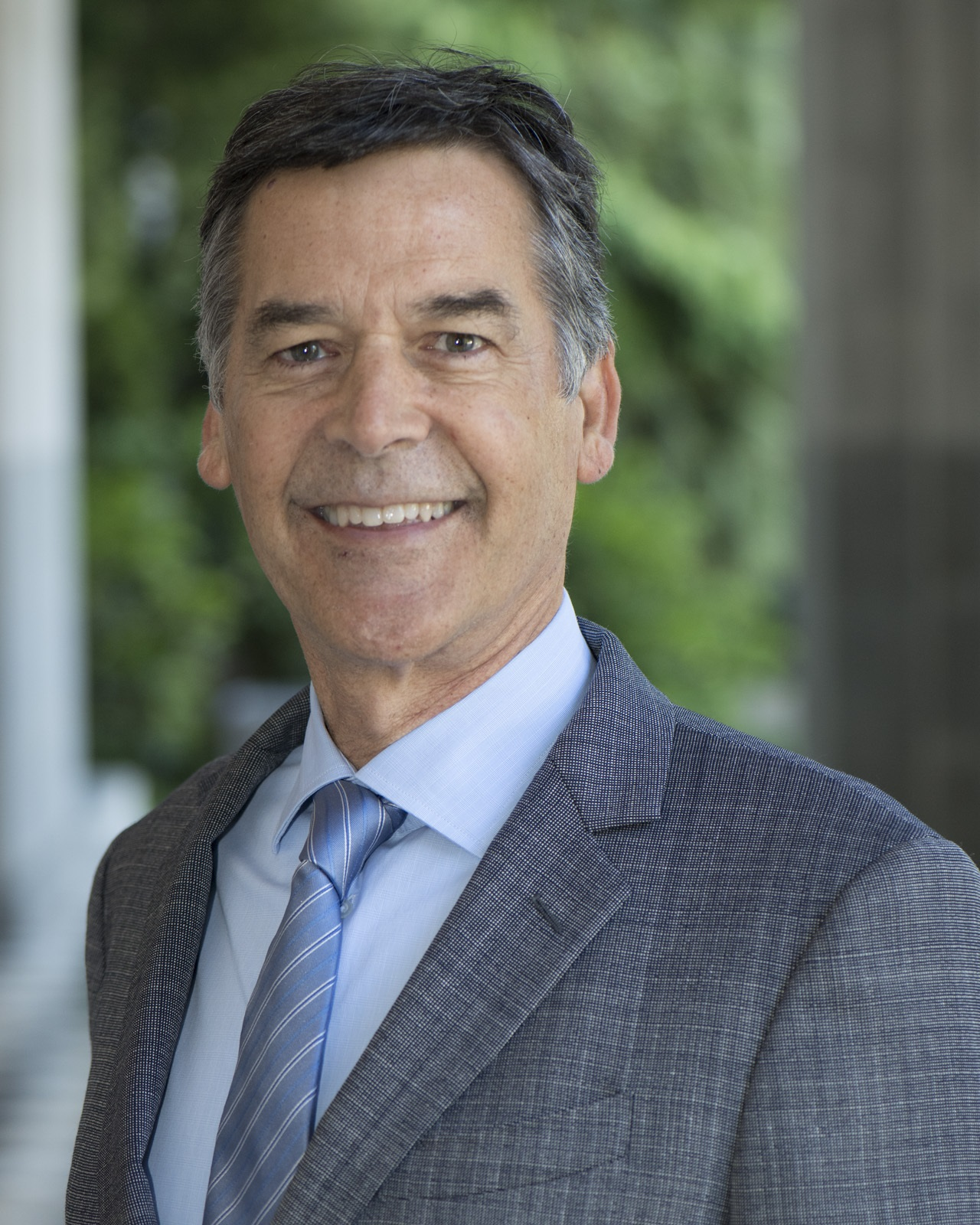
- Colligan in 2019
- Born: John Christopher Colligan; August 14, 1954 (age 72); Los Angeles, California, US
- Education: Georgetown University; Stanford University
- Occupations: entrepreneur investor
- Title: Monterey Bay Economic Partnership (co-founder); Accel Partners(former partner); Macromedia(former Chairman and CEO)
- Relatives: Ed Colligan (brother)

John C. "Bud" Colligan (born August 14, 1954) is a community activist, social entrepreneur, investor and company builder. He was appointed by Governor Gavin Newsom as his senior advisor for international affairs and trade in March, 2019. He is co-founder of the Monterey Bay Economic Partnership (MBEP), co-founder of the non-profit community-development organization Pacific Community Ventures, former partner at Accel Partners, a global venture capital firm, and former chairman and CEO of Macromedia, a multimedia software company.

== Early life and education ==
Colligan was born in Los Angeles, CA to John "Jack" Borradaile Colligan and Dolores Gertrude Gallagher, both descendants of the Armijo family. Colligan was raised in Glendale, CA along with five siblings, including youngest brother Edward "Ed" Colligan. He graduated in 1972 from Loyola High School.

He attended Georgetown University in Washington, D.C. While there, he led Students of Georgetown, Inc (known as “The Corp”), an organization offering Georgetown students hands-on experience running businesses, while concurrently funding philanthropic causes throughout the campus community. During his tenure at the Corp, Colligan founded Vital Vittles, which is today one of the nation's largest, student-owned and operated businesses. In 1976, Colligan graduated cum laude and Phi Beta Kappa from the Edmund A. Walsh School of Foreign Service at Georgetown with a BSFS in International Economics.

In 1983, Colligan earned an MBA from the Stanford Graduate School of Business.

== Community activism ==
Colligan has been involved in community affairs for more than 30 years, focusing on education and economic development, particularly in underserved communities.

=== Economic development ===
Colligan co-founded, served as chairman of the board from 1998 to 2010, and is currently chairman emeritus of Pacific Community Ventures (PCV).

PCV pioneered a new kind of venture-philanthropy, integrating traditional investment, active support, and impact measurement into its funding equation. From 1998 to 2015, Pacific Community Ventures raised and deployed more than $100 million in philanthropic and community-focused capital. These investments helped 3,000 California businesses to create or retain more than 30,000 jobs. PCV was recognized as one of the “25 brilliant California ideas of the last quarter century,” by both University of California at Los Angeles and University of California at Berkeley.

Colligan served on the Leadership Council of Opportunity Fund from 2012 to 2020, a not-for-profit microfinance provider. From 1995 to 2018, the fund invested over $320 million into California-based communities. In its fiscal year 2018, Opportunity Fund invested $92 million in small businesses, including serving 910 women entrepreneurs, 2,384 minority business owners, and 1,777 low-moderate income borrowers.

Colligan spearheaded the expansion of both Opportunity Fund and Pacific Community Ventures into Monterey, Santa Cruz and San Benito counties. The David and Lucille Packard Foundation, the Community Foundation for Monterey County and the Community Foundation for Santa Cruz County announced support for Opportunity Fund's micro lending efforts in 2014.

Colligan was a founding board member of Santa Cruz Works, a non-profit organization focused on developing jobs and a thriving eco-system for science and technology companies in the Monterey Bay region. He is also co-founder of the Monterey Bay Economic Partnership, whose mission is to improve the economic health and quality of life for all residents in the Monterey Bay region. In 2016, Colligan received California Forward's Regional Steward Leader Award for community service for “individuals who exemplify leadership that helps sustain the Golden State as a place to create and thrive, to enjoy and to explore, to nurture and to bestow to future generations.” In 2017, Colligan spearheaded the founding of the Monterey Bay Housing Trust as part of MBEP to facilitate more affordable housing in the Monterey Bay region.

=== Education ===
From 2011 to 2019, Colligan was an investor and advisor to EdSurge, which acts as a “Consumer Reports” for best practices and products in the education technology space. Edsurge became part of the International Society for Technology in Education in November, 2019. Colligan was also lead independent director and investor in lynda.com, which pioneered online video learning before its acquisition by LinkedIn in 2015 for $1.5 billion.

Colligan served on the board of directors of JobTrain from 2001 to 2010 and as chairman of the board from 2007 to 2009. JobTrain is a community-based education center that combines vocational training, academics and life-skills development. Since JobTrain's founding, it has helped more than 150,000 low-income individuals with their lifelong learning and job placement objectives. Colligan was the first investor in, and now serves on the board of advisors of Digital NEST (with programs in Watsonville, Modesto, Stockton, Gilroy and Salinas), which provides access and creates opportunity for underserved youth to learn digital skills.

An active supporter of Georgetown University, Colligan served from 1998 to 2015 on the board of visitors for the Edmund A. Walsh School of Foreign Service. He also served on Georgetown's board of regents from 2003 to 2009. In 2007, Colligan co-founded the Georgetown Technology Alliance (GTA) and served on its board of directors until 2015. Colligan received Georgetown's highest alumni honor in 2013, the John Carroll Award.

From 2020 to 2023, Colligan served on the board of directors of the California State University Monterey Bay Foundation, where he was also on the investment committee. In 2024, Colligan was named to the Chancellor's Advisory Board at University of California Santa Cruz.

== Professional career ==
In 1983, Colligan joined Apple Inc. as part of the team that launched the groundbreaking Macintosh personal computer. He later headed Apple's higher-education marketing group and grew revenues to more than half-a-billion dollars within three years. During his tenure at Apple, Colligan funded and sponsored Apple's visionary Knowledge Navigator video that premiered at Educom in 1987.

As an early expert in education technology, in 1989, Colligan was recruited to be the CEO of Authorware, a computer-based learning software provider. In 1992, he co-founded Macromedia, resulting from the merger of Authorware and MacroMind-Paracomp. He served as CEO of Macromedia from 1992 to 1997 and took the company public on NASDAQ in December, 1993. In 1996, Ernst and Young recognized Colligan as the “Software Entrepreneur of the Year.” He served as chairman of the Board of Macromedia until July, 1998. During Colligan's tenure, Macromedia's annual revenues grew to more than $100 million. In 2005, Adobe Systems acquired Macromedia for $3.4 billion.

Colligan was a partner at Accel Partners from 1998 to 2015, and focused on investments in software, digital media, education, mobile and cloud computing. He has been an investor and board member at lynda.com (LinkedIn), CNET Networks (CBS Interactive), Brightmail (Symantec), Yodlee (Envestnet), and Days of Wonder (Asmodee). As part of his investment activities in Monterey, Santa Cruz and San Benito counties, Colligan led the formation of Central Coast Angels in late 2013 to provide capital and mentoring to early-stage businesses in the Monterey Bay region. He is an investor in and advisor to PayStand, Boardgame Lab and Tixr.

In 2019, Governor Gavin Newsom appointed Colligan as California’s Senior Advisor for International Affairs and Trade. In this capacity, he was responsible for California’s initiatives in direct foreign investment, trade, infrastructure development, and policy positions in international affairs. Colligan organized California's first international trade mission of the Newsom administration to Mexico. He also rebuilt the international affairs and trade group to be an effective promoter of exports from the world's 4th largest economy.

== Personal life ==
Bud Colligan is married to Rebecca Ann Maliszewski. They live in Santa Cruz, California and have three sons, Daniel, Gregory, and Jesse.

=== Philanthropy ===
Colligan and his wife Rebecca have engaged in building community welfare over several decades, in social services, healthcare, the arts, education, affordable housing, and environmental protection.

== Recognition ==
1996: “Software Entrepreneur of the Year”, Ernst and Young.
2002: Finalist for the Thomas W. Ford Award for Community Service.
2012: Leadership in Energy and Environmental Design, Gold
2013: Outstanding Director, Silicon Valley Business Journal and San Francisco Business Times.
2013: The John Carroll Award, Georgetown University.
2014: Ebbie Award for Economic Development, Pacific Community Ventures
2016: California Forward Regional Steward Leader
2021: UCSC Colligan Clinical Diagnostic Laboratory
2022: Students Serving Students Award, The Georgetown Corp 50th Anniversary
2022: Rotary Honorary Paul Harris Fellowship

2026: University of California Santa Cruz, Community Changemaker Award
