= Altsys =

American software company

Altsys Corporation
- Industry: Computer software
- Founded: c. 1984
- Founder: James R. Von Ehr II
- Defunct: 1995
- Fate: Acquired by Macromedia
- Successor: Macromedia
- Headquarters: Texas

Altsys Corporation was a Texas-based software company founded by James R. Von Ehr II. It was an early Apple Macintosh developer and publisher.

Altsys' best known product was FreeHand, which was licensed to Aldus Corporation, was a vector drawing program that competed with Adobe Illustrator. It was published for many years, originally only on the Macintosh and Microsoft Windows. It was also ported for NeXT machines under the Virtuoso name.

When Aldus was acquired by Adobe, the licensing agreement that Altsys had with Aldus precluded FreeHand from being part of the deal, so the publishing rights reverted to Altsys. Altsys also published Metamorphosis for Macintosh, a font utility.

Altsys was acquired by Macromedia in January 1995. Von Ehr became a major Macromedia shareholder and joined the Macromedia board of directors.

== Products ==
- Fontographer for Windows and Mac OS - font editor
- Font-O-Matic for Windows - font transformer
- FreeHand for Windows and Mac OS - vector editor
- Virtuoso for NeXTSTEP/OPENSTEP and Solaris - vector editor
  - A version was announced, advertised and demonstrated for Windows NT, but never released.
- Metamorphosis for Mac OS - font utility
- Art Importer for Mac OS
