= Macromedia =

American software company

Macromedia, Inc.
- Final logo from March 1997 to December 2005
- Type: Public
- Traded as: Nasdaq: MACR
- Industry: Computer software
- Founded: February 25, 1992; 34 years ago
- Defunct: December 3, 2005; 20 years ago
- Fate: Acquired by Adobe Systems
- Successor: Adobe Systems
- Headquarters: San Francisco, California (incorporated under DGCL); United States
- Key people: Michael Nielsen, Co-Founder, Macromedia; Marc Canter, Founder, MacroMind, Michael W. Allen Founder, Authorware; Bud Colligan and Tim Mott, Co-Founders, Macromedia
- Products: Macromedia ColdFusion; Macromedia Flash; Macromedia Fireworks; Macromedia Freehand; Macromedia Dreamweaver; Macromedia Director; Macromedia Authorware; Macromedia Fontographer; Macromedia Sitespring
- Number of employees: 1,445 (2004)
- Website: macromedia.com at the Wayback Machine (archived 2005-12-31)

Macromedia, Inc. was an American graphics, multimedia, and web development software company headquartered in San Francisco, California, that made products such as Flash and Dreamweaver. It was purchased by its rival Adobe Systems on December 3, 2005.

== History ==
Macromedia was formed from the April 1992 merger of Authorware Inc. (makers of Authorware) and MacroMind–Paracomp (makers of MacroMind Director). At the time, analysts estimated the multimedia software industry to be worth $200 million, and the combined company would control 20% of the market. Tim Mott of MacroMind was named chairman and chief executive officer and Bud Colligan of Authorware became president and CEO of the new company.

Director, an interactive multimedia-authoring tool used to make presentations, animations, CD-ROMs and information kiosks, served as the company's flagship product. Director was used in the creation of many multimedia projects, training programs and presentations for American Airlines, AT&T, and Kellogg's, and even Hollywood films like Jurassic Park and The Firm. Authorware was Macromedia's principal product in the interactive learning market.

By 1993, Macromedia was considered the largest supplier of multimedia development tools. The increased demand in CD-ROM players and multimedia experiences helped Macromedia turn a profit. Analysts estimated that Macromedia had 1992 revenues of about $30 million.

As the Internet moved from a university research medium to a commercial network, Macromedia began working to web-enable its existing tools and develop new products. In 1995, it introduced Shockwave Player, a free Director plugin for Netscape Navigator to display interactive content on the web. Macromedia licensed Sun's Java Programming Language in October 1995.

=== Acquisition of FreeHand ===
In January 1995, Macromedia acquired Altsys Corporation, developer of the vector-drawing program FreeHand and font editor Fontographer. Adobe Systems had acquired Aldus Corporation, which held the marketing rights to FreeHand. Because of the program's similarities with Adobe Illustrator, Altsys protested the sale and the Federal Trade Commission issued a complaint in October 1994, ordering the divestiture of FreeHand back to Altsys. The company then sold itself to Macromedia.

With Macromedia's acquisition of Altsys, it received FreeHand thus expanding its product line of multimedia graphics software to include illustration and design graphics software. FreeHand's vector graphics rendering engine and other software components within the program would prove useful to Macromedia in the development of Fireworks.

Despite early success, Macromedia's stock ultimately plateaued at $63.75 per share in December 1995. By 1997, shares fell as low as $7.13 per share. Rob Burgess was brought on as president in 1996. He laid off 10% of the company's staff, discontinued many products, and put a larger focus on web development.

=== Dreamweaver ===
In March 1996, Macromedia acquired iBand Inc., developer of the Backstage family of dynamic web development tools, for $32 million. Macromedia developed a new HTML-authoring tool, Dreamweaver, around portions of the Backstage codebase and released the first version in December 1997.

At the time, most professional web authors preferred to code HTML by hand using text editors because they wanted full control over the source. Dreamweaver addressed this with its "Roundtrip HTML" feature, which attempted to preserve the fidelity of hand-edited source code during visual edits, allowing users to work back and forth between visual and code editing.

Over the next few years Dreamweaver gained popularity among professional web authors, though many still preferred hand-coding, and Microsoft FrontPage remained a strong competitor for amateur and business users. By October 1999, an estimated 66% of professional web site developers used Dreamweaver.

=== Flash ===
Macromedia acquired FutureWave Software, makers of FutureSplash Animator, in January 1997. FutureSplash Animator was an animation tool originally developed for pen-based computing devices. Because of the small size of the FutureSplash Viewer application, it was particularly suited for download over the Internet, where most users, at the time, had low-bandwidth connections. Macromedia renamed Splash to Macromedia Flash and distributed the Flash Player as a free browser plugin in order to quickly gain market share.

By April 1998, the company released the technical specifications for its Flash format so other programs could view and edit its files. Burgess took over as CEO in July 1998, after founder Bud Colligan stepped down. By December, Macromedia was stable again.

Hoping to remain a major player in the increasingly interactive web, Flash Player 6.0 shipped in March 2002 and featured enhanced audio, video, and user interface capabilities. Macromedia also released a bundle of its internet applications in June.

By 2005, more computers worldwide had the Flash Player installed than any other Web media format, including Java, QuickTime, RealNetworks, and Windows Media Player.

As Flash matured, Macromedia's focus shifted from marketing it as a graphics and media tool to promoting it as a Web application platform, adding scripting and data access capabilities to the player while attempting to retain its small footprint.

=== Other acquisitions ===
Macromedia logo used until 1997

In July 1999, Macromedia acquired Elemental Software, gaining control of Drumbeat 2000 and eStore Builder. The company also bought web site monitoring and personalization software developer Andromedia for $245 million that December to expand into e-commerce. It further inked alliances with web consulting and marketing services firm USWeb/CKS and e-commerce platform developer Broadvision.

Web development company Allaire was acquired in 2001 and Macromedia added several popular servers and Web developments tools to its portfolio, including ColdFusion, a web application server based on the CFML language, JRun, a Java EE application server, and HomeSite, an HTML code editor that was also bundled with Dreamweaver. By 2002, Macromedia had produced more than 20 products and had 30 offices in 13 countries.

In 2003, Macromedia acquired the web conferencing company Presedia and continued to develop and enhance their Flash-based online collaboration and presentation product offering under the brand Breeze. Later that year, Macromedia also acquired help authoring software company eHelp Corporation, whose products included RoboHelp and RoboDemo (now Adobe Captivate).

=== Lawsuits ===
On August 22, 1997, stockholders filed a class-action lawsuit in the California Superior Court in San Francisco, accusing Macromedia of misleading stockholders on the company's product success and financial health. A similar suit had been filed a month earlier. The class-action suit was dismissed by a federal judge on May 19, 1998.

On August 10, 2000, Adobe claimed that Macromedia violated two of its patents on tabbed palettes. Macromedia countered with a claim that Adobe infringed on Macromedia's patents for a draw-based editor for Web pages and a hierarchical structure editor for Web sites. In July 2002, Adobe and Macromedia reached an agreement that settled all claims in this series of patent suits.

=== Purchase by Adobe ===
On April 18, 2005, Adobe Systems announced an agreement to acquire Macromedia in a stock swap valued at approximately $3.4 billion on the last trading day before the announcement. The acquisition took place on December 3, 2005, and Adobe integrated the company's operations, networks, and customer care organizations shortly thereafter.

== Shockwave.com ==
Hoping to push into entertainment, Macromedia launched the ShockRave website in February 1998, in partnership with MTV. The website featured interactive music videos, puzzles, games, and animated cartoons. In May 1999, Macromedia launched Shockwave.com to promote the capabilities of Flash and Shockwave. It featured music, comics, and games, supported offline downloads, and even offered a premium version called Shockmachine. South Park creators Trey Parker and Matt Stone were contracted to create an original animated series for the website in exchange for equity in the company.

In December 1999, the company managed to secure $44 million in funding from Sequoia Capital to support its six million users. By this point, it was estimated that 100 million people had installed the company's Shockwave and Flash players. In October 1999, Macromedia announced it would spin off Shockwave as an independent company. CEO Rob Burgess initially stayed on with both companies. Macromedia maintained a majority stake in Shockwave.com until December 2000, when it merged with AtomFilms.

== Leadership ==
- 1992: Bud Colligan became co-founder and CEO of Macromedia, a position he held until 1997; he served as board chairman 1992–1998.
- 1994: Altsys Corp and CEO James Von Ehr became a Macromedia vice-president, a position he held until 1997.
- 1996: Robert K. Burgess was hired as president of Macromedia, and became CEO in 1997, a position he held until 2005; he served as board chairman 1998–2005, a position he held when the company was acquired by Adobe.
- 1997: Betsey Nelson became chief financial officer, a position she held until Macromedia was acquired by Adobe.
- 2004: Stephen Elop became chief operating officer.
- 2005: Stephen Elop had been CEO for three months when Macromedia announced it would be acquired by Adobe.

== Products ==
=== Part of Adobe ===
- Adobe Animate (formerly Flash Professional)
- Adobe Captivate (formerly RoboDemo)
- Adobe ColdFusion
- Adobe Connect (formerly Macromedia Breeze, Adobe Acrobat Connect Pro)
- Adobe Dreamweaver
- Adobe RoboHelp

=== Discontinued products ===
- Adobe Flash
- Adobe Flash Media Server
- Adobe Authorware
- Adobe Contribute
- Adobe Director
- Adobe Fireworks
- Adobe Flash
  - Adobe Flash Lite
  - Adobe Flash Player
- Adobe Flex
  - Macromedia Flex Data Services (rebranded as Adobe LiveCycle Data Services)
- Adobe JRun
- Adobe Shockwave
- Macromedia Aria
- Macromedia Action!
- Macromedia Aftershock
- Macromedia Backstage (became the basis to Macromedia Dreamweaver)
- Macromedia Central (replaced by AIR)
- Macromedia Deck
- Macromedia Drumbeat (replaced by Dreamweaver UltraDev)
- Macromedia Extreme 3D
- Macromedia FlashPaper
- Macromedia Fontographer (sold to FontLab and became Fontographer)
- Macromedia FreeHand
- Macromedia Generator
- Macromedia HomeSite
- Macromedia Kawa
- Macromedia KeyGrip/Macromedia Final Cut (sold to Apple and became Final Cut Pro)
- Macromedia Likeminds
- Macromodel
- Macromedia MediaMaker
- Macromedia Projector
- Macromedia RoboInfo
- Macromedia Shockmachine
- Macromedia Sitespring
- Macromedia SoundEdit 16
- Macromedia Spectra
- Macromedia Web Publishing System
- Macromedia xRes

== See also ==
- Macromedia software
