= Adobe Inc. =

American multinational software company

Coordinates: 37.3307°N 121.8940°W

- Logo since 2024

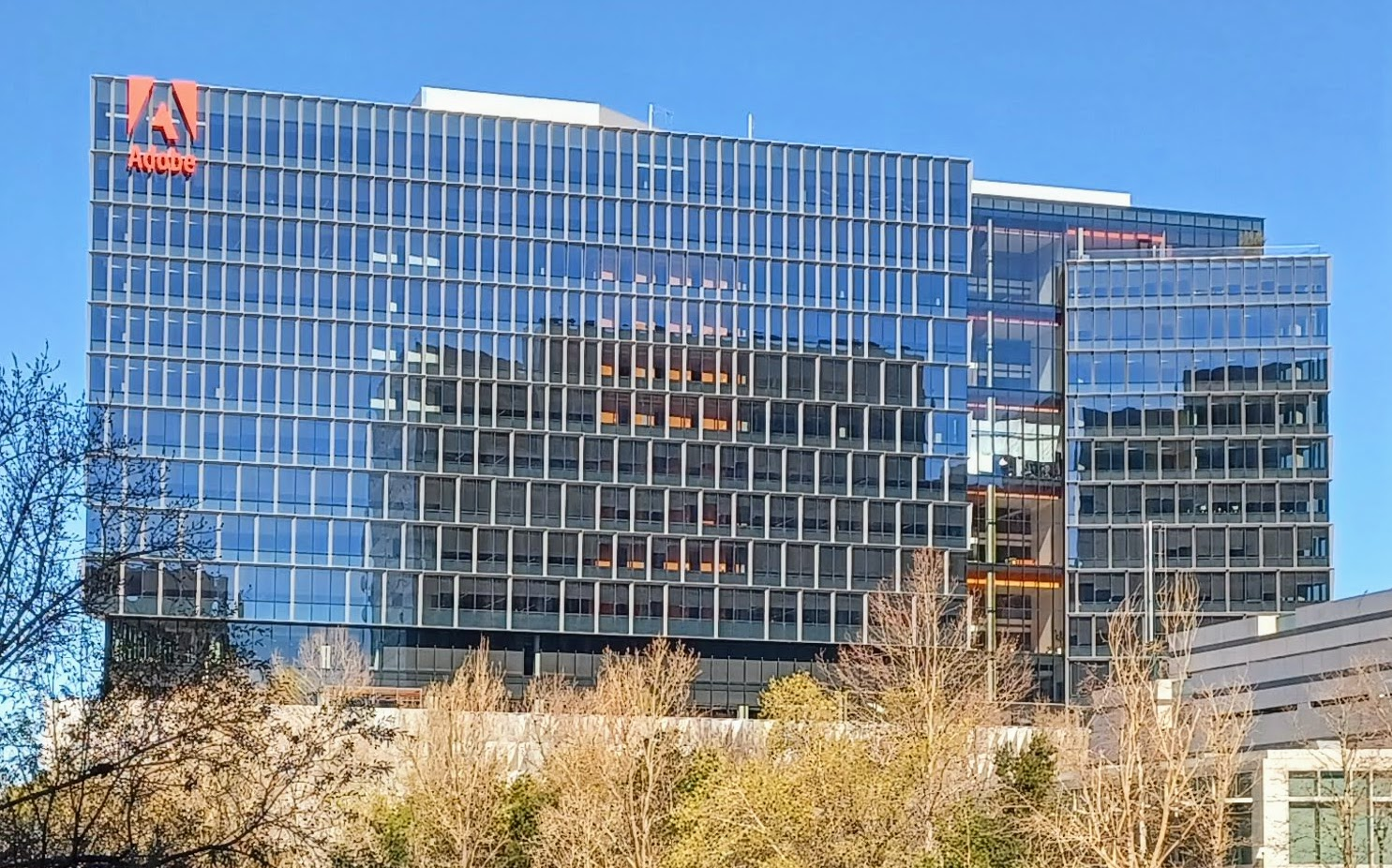
- Adobe World Headquarters in San Jose, California
- Trade name: Adobe
- Formerly: Adobe Systems Incorporated (1982–2018)
- Type: Public
- Traded as: Nasdaq: ADBE; Nasdaq-100 component; S&P 100 component; S&P 500 component
- Industry: Software
- Founded: December 1982; 43 years ago Mountain View, California, U.S.
- Founders: John Warnock; Charles Geschke
- Headquarters: Adobe World Headquarters, San Jose, California, U.S.
- Area served: Worldwide
- Key people: Shantanu Narayen (chairman & CEO)
- Products: Photoshop; Acrobat; Illustrator; PDF; Lightroom; Captivate; ColdFusion; XD; Dreamweaver; InDesign; Express; Premiere; RoboHelp; FrameMaker; Creative Cloud; (Full list)
- Services: SaaS
- Revenue: ▲US$23.77 billion (2025)
- Operating income: ▲US$8.71 billion (2025)
- Net income: ▲US$7.13 billion (2025)
- Total assets: ▼US$29.50 billion (2025)
- Total equity: ▼US$11.62 billion (2025)
- Number of employees: 31,360 (November 2025)
- Website: adobe.com
- Footnotes; Financials as of November 28, 2025.

Adobe Inc. (/əˈdoʊbi/ ə-DOH-bee), formerly Adobe Systems Incorporated, is an American multinational computer software company based in San Jose, California. It offers a wide range of programs from web design tools, photo manipulation, and vector creation to video and audio editing, mobile app development, print layout and animation software.

It has historically specialized in software for the creation and publication of a wide range of content, including Graphics, Photography, Illustration, Animation, multimedia/video, Motion pictures and print. Its flagship products include Adobe Photoshop image editing software; Adobe Illustrator vector-based illustration software; Adobe Acrobat and the Portable Document Format (PDF); and a host of tools primarily for audio-visual content creation, editing, and publishing. Adobe offered a bundled solution of its products named Adobe Creative Suite, which evolved into a subscription-based offering named Adobe Creative Cloud. The company also expanded into digital marketing software and in 2021 was considered one of the top global leaders in Customer Experience Management (CXM).

Adobe was founded in December 1982 by John Warnock and Charles Geschke, who established the company after leaving Xerox PARC to develop and sell the PostScript page description language. In 1985, Apple Computer licensed PostScript for use in its LaserWriter printers, which helped spark the desktop publishing revolution. Adobe later developed animation and multimedia through its acquisition of Macromedia, from which it acquired Macromedia Flash; video editing and compositing software with Adobe Premiere, later known as Adobe Premiere Pro; low-code web development with Adobe Muse; and a suite of software for digital marketing management.

As of 2022, Adobe had more than 26,000 employees worldwide. Adobe also has major development operations in the United States in Newton, New York City, Arden Hills, Lehi, Seattle, Austin and San Francisco. It also has major development operations in Noida and Bangalore in India. The company has long been the dominant tech firm in design and creative software, despite attracting criticism for its policies and practices, particularly around Adobe Creative Cloud's switch to subscription-only pricing and its early termination fees for its most promoted Creative Cloud plan, the latter of which attracted a joint civil lawsuit from the U.S. Federal Trade Commission and the U.S. Department of Justice in 2024.

== History ==
Logo of Adobe Systems, 1982–1993

=== PostScript (1982–2000) ===
The company was started in John Warnock's garage. The name of the company, Adobe, comes from Adobe Creek in Los Altos, California, a stream which ran behind Warnock's house. The creek is named because of the type of clay found there (Adobe being a Spanish word for Mudbrick). Adobe's corporate logo features a stylized "A" and was designed by graphic designer Marva Warnock, John Warnock's wife. Steve Jobs attempted to buy the company for $5 million in 1982, but Warnock and Geschke refused. Their investors urged them to work something out with Jobs, so they agreed to sell him shares worth 19 percent of the company. Jobs paid a five-times multiple of their company's valuation at the time, plus a five-year license fee for PostScript, in advance. The purchase and advance made Adobe the first company in the history of Silicon Valley to become profitable in its first year.

Warnock and Geschke considered various business options including a copy-service business and a turnkey system for office printing. Then it chose to focus on developing specialized printing software and created the Adobe PostScript page description language.

PostScript was the first international standard for computer printing as it included algorithms describing the letter-forms of many languages. Adobe added kanji printer products in 1988. Warnock and Geschke were also able to bolster the credibility of PostScript by connecting with a typesetting manufacturer. They weren't able to work with Compugraphic, but then worked with Linotype to license the Helvetica and Times Roman fonts (through the Linotron 100). By 1987, PostScript had become the industry-standard printer language with more than 400 third-party software programs and licensing agreements with 19 printer companies.

Adobe's first products after PostScript were digital fonts which they released in a proprietary format called Type 1, worked on by Bill Paxton after he left Stanford. Apple subsequently developed a competing standard, TrueType, which provided full scalability and precise control of the pixel pattern created by the font's outlines, and licensed it to Microsoft.

=== Introduction of creative software (1986–1996) ===
Starting in the mid-1980s, Adobe entered the consumer software market, starting with Adobe Illustrator, a vector-based drawing program for the Apple Macintosh. Illustrator, which grew out of the firm's in-house font-development software, helped popularize PostScript-enabled laser printers.

By the mid-1990s, Adobe would acquire Photoshop from John and Thomas Knoll, FrameMaker from Frame Technology Corporation, and After Effects and PageMaker from Aldus, as well as develop Adobe Premiere, later known as Premiere Pro, in-house, initially releasing it in 1991. Around the same time as the development of Illustrator, Adobe entered the NASDAQ Composite index in August 1986.

Logo of Adobe Inc., 1993–2017

=== PDFs and file formats (1993–1999) ===
In 1993, Adobe introduced the Portable Document Format, commonly shortened to the initialism PDF, and its Adobe Acrobat and Reader software. Warnock originally developed the PDF under a code name, "The Camelot Project", using PostScript technology to create a widely available digital document format, able to display text, raster graphics, vector graphics, and fonts. Adobe kept the PDF as a proprietary file format from its introduction until 2008, when the PDF became an ISO international standard under ISO number ISO 32000-1:2008, though the PDF file format was free for viewers since its introduction.

With its acquisition of Aldus, in addition to gaining PageMaker and After Effects, Adobe gained control over the TIFF file format for images.

=== Creative Suite and the Macromedia acquisition (2000–2009) ===
The 2000s saw various developments for the company. Its first notable acquisition in the decade was in 2002, when Adobe acquired Canadian company Accelio, also known as JetForm. In May 2003, Adobe purchased audio editing and multitrack recording software Cool Edit Pro from Syntrillium Software for $16.5 million, as well as a large loop library called "Loopology". Adobe then renamed Cool Edit Pro to Adobe Audition. It was in 2003 that the company introduced the first version of Adobe Creative Suite, bundling its creative software into a single package. The first version of Creative Suite introduced InDesign (the successor to PageMaker), Illustrator, Photoshop, ImageReady and InCopy, with the 2005 second edition of Creative Suite including an updated version of Adobe Acrobat, Premiere Pro, GoLive, the file manager Adobe Bridge, and Adobe Dreamweaver, the latter of which was acquired from a $3.4 billion acquisition of Macromedia, most notably.

In addition to bringing in Dreamweaver, the $3.4 billion Macromedia acquisition, completed as a stock swap, added ColdFusion, Contribute, Captivate, Breeze (rebranded as Adobe Connect), Director, Fireworks, Flash, Flash Professional, FlashPaper, Flex, FreeHand, HomeSite, JRun, Presenter, and Authorware to Adobe's product line.

By April 2008, Adobe released Adobe Media Player. On April 27, Adobe discontinued the development and sales of its older HTML/web development software, GoLive, in favor of Dreamweaver. Adobe offered a discount on Dreamweaver for GoLive users and supports those who still use GoLive with online tutorials and migration assistance. On June 1, Adobe launched Acrobat.com, a series of web applications geared for collaborative work. Creative Suite 4, which includes Design, Web, Production Premium, and Master Collection came out in October 2008 in six configurations at prices from about US$1,700 to $2,500 or by individual application. The Windows version of Photoshop includes 64-bit processing.

On December 3, 2008, Adobe laid off 600 of its employees (8% of the worldwide staff) citing the weak economic environment. On September 15, 2009, Adobe Systems announced that it would acquire online marketing and web analytics company Omniture for $1.8 billion. The deal was completed on October 23, 2009. Former Omniture products were integrated into the Adobe Marketing Cloud. On November 10, 2009, the company laid off a further 680 employees.

=== Security breach, and employee compensation class action (2010–2014) ===
Logo of Adobe Systems, 2017–2024

Adobe's 2010 was marked by continuing arguments with Apple over the latter's non-support for Adobe Flash on its iPhone, iPad and other products. Former Apple CEO Steve Jobs claimed that Flash was not reliable or secure enough, while Adobe executives have argued that Apple wishes to maintain control over the iOS platform. In April 2010, Steve Jobs published a post titled Thoughts on Flash where he outlined his thoughts on Flash and the rise of HTML5. In July 2010, Adobe bought Day Software integrating its line of CQ Products: WCM, DAM, SOCO, and Mobile

In January 2011, Adobe acquired DemDex, Inc. with the intent of adding DemDex's audience-optimization software to its online marketing suite. At Photoshop World 2011, Adobe unveiled a new mobile photo service. Carousel was a new application for iPhone, iPad, and Mac that used Photoshop Lightroom technology to allow users to adjust and fine-tune images on all platforms. Carousel also allowed users to automatically sync, share and browse photos. The service was later renamed "Adobe Revel". Later that same year in October, Adobe acquired Nitobi Software, the maker of the mobile application development framework PhoneGap. As part of the acquisition, the source code of PhoneGap was submitted to the Apache Foundation, where it became Apache Cordova.

In November 2011, Adobe announced that it would cease development of Flash Player for mobile devices following version 11.1. Instead, it would focus on HTML5 for mobile web development. In December 2011, Adobe announced that it had entered into a definitive agreement to acquire privately held Efficient Frontier. In December 2012, Adobe opened a new 280,000-square-foot (26,000 m^{2}) corporate campus in Lehi, Utah.

In 2013, Adobe endured a major security breach. Vast portions of the source code for the company's software were stolen and posted online and over 150 million records of Adobe's customers were made readily available for download. In 2012, about 40 million sets of payment card information were compromised by a hack at Adobe.

A class-action lawsuit alleging that the company suppressed employee compensation was filed against Adobe, and three other Silicon Valley–based companies in a California federal district court in 2013. In May 2014, it was revealed the four companies, Adobe, Apple, Google, and Intel had reached an agreement with the plaintiffs, 64,000 employees of the four companies, to pay a sum of $324.5 million to settle the suit.

=== Adobe Creative Cloud (Since 2011) ===
2011 saw the company first introduce Adobe Creative Cloud, a $600/year subscription plan to its creative software as opposed to a one-time perpetual license payment which could often top $2000 for creative professionals. The initial launch of Creative Cloud alongside Creative Suite 5 users came at the same time that Adobe ran into controversy from users of Adobe's creative software, with users of Adobe software stating that the original perpetual and subscription pricing plans for CS5 would be unaffordable for not only individuals but also businesses, as well as refusing to extend a Creative Suite 6 discount to non-CS5 users. The original announcement of Adobe Creative Cloud was met with a positive reception from CNET journalists as a much more enticing plan, and Creative Cloud was first released in 2012, though a later CNET survey evidenced that more users had a negative perception about subscription creative software than a positive view. The original pricing plan for Creative Cloud was $75 per month for the entire suite of software, though Adobe discounted the monthly cost to $50 for users willing to commit to at least one year of continuous subscription for Creative Cloud, and down to $30 per month for former CS users with the one year commitment.

By 2013, Adobe decided that CS6 would be the last version of Creative Suite software that would be sold through perpetual licensing option, and in May announced that a Creative Cloud subscription would be the only way to get the newest versions of Photoshop, Illustrator, and other Adobe creative software. Reception to the mandatory subscriptions for future Adobe software was mostly negative, despite some positive testimonies on the move from customers and Adobe's attraction of 500,000 Creative Cloud subscribers by the service's first year. The switch to subscription only also did not deter software piracy of Creative Cloud services; within the first day of the first version of Photoshop exclusively made for Creative Cloud being released, cracked versions of Adobe Photoshop CC 2013 were found on The Pirate Bay, an online website used for distributing pirated software.

=== End of Flash, further acquisitions and failed buyout of Figma (2018–2023) ===
On July 25, 2017, Adobe announced that it would end support for the normal/global variant of Flash Player on January 1, 2021, and encouraged developers to use HTML5 standards in place of Flash. The announcement was coordinated with Apple, Facebook, Google, Microsoft, and Mozilla. Adobe announced that all major web browsers planned to officially remove the Adobe Flash Player component on December 31, 2020, and Microsoft removed it from the Windows OS in January 2021 via Windows Update. In a move to further reduce the number of Flash Player installations, Adobe added a "time bomb" to Flash to disable existing installations after January 12, 2021. In mid-2020, Flash Player started prompting users to uninstall itself. Adobe removed all existing download links for Flash installers. After January 26, 2021, all major web browsers including Apple Safari, Google Chrome, Microsoft Edge, and Mozilla Firefox have already permanently removed Flash support. However, Flash content continues to be accessible on the web through emulators such as Ruffle, with varying degrees of compatibility and performance, although this is not endorsed by Adobe.

In March 2018, at Adobe Summit, the company and Nvidia announced their association to upgrade their AI and profound learning innovations. They planned to streamline Adobe Sensei AI and machine learning structure for Nvidia GPUs. Adobe and Nvidia had cooperated for 10 years on GPU quickening. This incorporates Sensei-powered features, e.g. auto lip-sync in Adobe Character Animator CC and face-aware editing in Photoshop CC, and also cloud-based AI/ML items and features, for example, picture investigation for Adobe Stock and Lightroom CC and auto-labeling in Adobe Experience Supervisor.

Adobe further spent its time from 2018 to 2023 acquiring more companies to boost both Creative Cloud and the Adobe Experience Cloud, a software suite which increased business. These included e-commerce services provider Magento Commerce from private equity firm Permira for $1.68 billion in June 2018, Marketo for $4.75 billion in 2018, Allegorithmic in 2019 for just under $160 million, and Workfront in December 2020 for $1.5 billion. 2021 additionally saw Adobe add payment services to its e-commerce platforms in an attempt to compete with Shopify, accepting both credit cards and PayPal.

In July 2020, as the United States presidential elections approached, the software giant imposed a ban on the political ads features on its digital advertising sales platform.

On November 9, 2020, Adobe announced it would spend US$1.5 billion to acquire Workfront, a provider of marketing collaboration software. The acquisition was completed in early December 2020.

On August 19, 2021, Adobe announced it had entered into a definitive agreement to acquire Frame.io, a leading cloud-based video collaboration platform. The transaction is valued at $1.275 billion and closed during the fourth quarter of Adobe's 2021 fiscal year.

Adobe announced a $20 billion acquisition of Figma, an Adobe XD competitor, in September 2022, its largest to date. Regulatory scrutiny from the US and European Union began shortly after due to concerns that Adobe, already a major player in the design software market with XD, would have too much control if it also owned Figma. At the time of the announcement to acquire Figma, Adobe's share over the creative software market and design-software market was almost a monopoly. In December 2023, the two companies called off their merger, citing the regulatory challenges as a sign to both that the deal was not likely to be approved. Adobe paid Figma a $1 billion termination fee per their merger agreement.

=== FTC lawsuit and terms of service update (2024–2026) ===
On June 17, 2024, the US Federal Trade Commission together with the US Department of Justice filed a lawsuit against Adobe for its subscription business model practice, citing hidden termination fees and the company pushing customers towards more expensive plans. On March 13, 2026, the lawsuit was settled out of court for $150M.

In June 2024, after facing backlash for its changes to the terms of service, Adobe updated them to explicitly pledge it will not use customer data to train its artificial intelligence models.

In November 2025, Adobe Inc. announced its agreement to acquire Semrush for $1.9 billion.

=== AI competition ===
In March 2026, Adobe announced Shantanu Narayen would step down from his position as CEO after 18 years. Narayen was expected to stay on until a new CEO was identified and remain as chairman. Adobe, among other software companies, were in investor crosshairs amid concerns about competitive threats from increased AI adoption. Ultimately, Anil Chakravarthy, the president of Adobe’s Customer Experience Orchestration business and worldwide field operations was announced to take over the president and CEO positions on December 1, 2026.

On March 16, 2026, Adobe and Nvidia announced a strategic partnership to deliver next-generation Adobe Firefly models and agentic workflows. The collaboration spans AI model development, 3D product visualization, document intelligence, and cloud media workflows, with a joint go-to-market strategy targeting enterprise customers through Adobe's Firefly Foundry platform.

== Products ==
Adobe's currently supported roster of software, online services and file formats comprises the following (as of October 2022):

Graphic design software
Name	Icon	Type
Photoshop		Raster graphics editor
Photoshop Elements		Raster graphics editor, hobbyist
Illustrator		Vector graphics editor
Acrobat DC		Portable Document Format viewer, creator, and editor
FrameMaker		Complex document processor
XD		Vector design tool for web and mobile applications
InDesign		Desktop publishing design and typesetting tool
InCopy		Word processor to edit the textual parts in InDesign layouts.
Lightroom		Raw image processor
Express		Vector design tool for web and mobile applications

Web design software
Name	Icon	Type
Dreamweaver		Web development tool
Flash		Multimedia software platform

Video editing, audio editing, animation, and visual effects software
Name	Icon	Type
Premiere Pro		Non-linear video editor
Premiere Elements		Non-linear video editor, hobbyist
Audition		Audio editor
After Effects		Digital visual effects, motion graphics, and compositing application
Character Animator		Motion capture tool
Prelude		Broadcast ingest and logging application
Animate		Computer animation application

E-learning software
Name	Icon	Type
Captivate		E-learning course authoring tool
Presenter Video Express		Screencasting recorder and editor
Connect		Teleconferencing and videotelephony tool

Web design software
Name	Icon	Type
ColdFusion		Rapid web-application development platform
Content Server		E-book digital rights management system
LiveCycle		Java EE Service-oriented architecture software

3D and AR software by Mixamo
Name	Icon	Type
Aero		Augmented reality authoring and publishing tool
Dimension		3D rendering and rudimentary design tool
Substance 3D		Suite of 3D model and texture authoring tools.

=== Formats ===
Portable Document Format (PDF), PDF's predecessor PostScript, ActionScript, Shockwave Flash (SWF), Flash Video (FLV), and Filmstrip (.flm)

=== Web-hosted services ===
Adobe Color, Photoshop Express, Acrobat.com, Behance and Adobe Express.

=== Adobe Renderer ===
Adobe Media Encoder

=== Adobe Stock ===
A microstock agency that presently provides over 57 million high-resolution, royalty-free images and videos available to license (via subscription or credit purchase methods). In 2015, Adobe acquired Fotolia, a stock content marketplace founded in 2005 by Thibaud Elziere, Oleg Tscheltzoff, and Patrick Chassany which operated in 23 countries. It was run as a stand-alone website until 2019, but has since been integrated into Adobe Stock.

=== Adobe Experience Platform ===
A family of content, development, and customer relationship management products, with what Adobe calls the "next generation" of its Sensei artificial intelligence and machine learning framework, introduced in March 2019.

== Criticisms ==
=== Pricing ===
Adobe has been criticized for its pricing practices, with retail prices being up to twice as much in non-US countries.

After Adobe revealed the pricing for the Creative Suite 3 Master Collection, which was £1,000 higher for European customers, a petition to protest over "unfair pricing" was published and signed by 10,000 users. In June 2009, Adobe further increased its prices in the UK by 10% in spite of weakening of the pound against the dollar, and UK users were not allowed to buy from the US store.

Adobe's Reader and Flash programs were listed on "The 10 most hated programs of all time" article by TechRadar.

=== Security ===
Hackers have exploited vulnerabilities in Adobe programs, such as Adobe Reader, to gain unauthorized access to computers. Adobe's Flash Player has also been criticized for, among other things, suffering from performance, memory usage and security problems. A report by security researchers from Kaspersky Lab criticized Adobe for producing the products having top 10 security vulnerabilities.

Observers noted that Adobe was spying on its customers by including spyware in the Creative Suite 3 software and quietly sending user data to a firm named Omniture. When users became aware, Adobe explained what the suspicious software did and admitted that they: "could and should do a better job taking security concerns into account". When a security flaw was later discovered in Photoshop CS5, Adobe sparked outrage by saying it would leave the flaw unpatched, so anyone who wanted to use the software securely would have to pay for an upgrade. Following a fierce backlash Adobe decided to provide the software patch.

Adobe has been criticized for pushing unwanted software including third-party browser toolbars and free virus scanners, usually as part of the Flash update process, and for pushing a third-party scareware program designed to scare users into paying for unneeded system repairs.

=== Customer data breach ===
On October 3, 2013, the company initially revealed that 2.9 million customers' sensitive and personal data was stolen in a security breach which included encrypted credit card information. Adobe later admitted that 38 million active users have been affected and the attackers obtained access to their IDs and encrypted passwords, as well as to many inactive Adobe accounts. The company did not make it clear if all the personal information was encrypted, such as email addresses and physical addresses, though data privacy laws in 44 states require this information to be encrypted.

In late 2013 a 3.8 GB file stolen from Adobe and containing 152 million usernames, reversibly encrypted passwords and unencrypted password hints was posted on AnonNews.org. LastPass, a password security firm, said that Adobe failed to use best practices for securing the passwords and has not salted them. Another security firm, Sophos, showed that Adobe used a weak encryption method permitting the recovery of a lot of information with very little effort. According to IT expert Simon Bain, Adobe has failed its customers and 'should hang their heads in shame'.

Many of the credit cards were tied to the Creative Cloud software-by-subscription service. Adobe offered its affected US customers a free membership in a credit monitoring service, but no similar arrangements have been made for non-US customers. When a data breach occurs in the US, penalties depend on the state where the victim resides, not where the company is based.

After stealing the customers' data, cyber-thieves also accessed Adobe's source code repository, likely in mid-August 2013. Because hackers acquired copies of the source code of Adobe proprietary products, they could find and exploit any potential weaknesses in its security, computer experts warned. Security researcher Alex Holden, chief information security officer of Hold Security, characterized this Adobe breach, which affected Acrobat, ColdFusion and numerous other applications, as "one of the worst in US history". Adobe also announced that hackers stole parts of the source code of Photoshop, which according to commentators could allow programmers to copy its engineering techniques and would make it easier to pirate Adobe's expensive products.

Published on a server of a Russian-speaking hacker group, the "disclosure of encryption algorithms, other security schemes, and software vulnerabilities can be used to bypass protections for individual and corporate data" and may have opened the gateway to new generation zero-day attacks. Hackers already used ColdFusion exploits to make off with usernames and encrypted passwords of PR Newswire's customers, which has been tied to the Adobe security breach. They also used a ColdFusion exploit to breach Washington state court and expose up to 200,000 Social Security numbers.

=== Anti-competitive practices ===
In 1994, Adobe acquired Aldus Corp., a software vendor that sold FreeHand, a competing product. FreeHand was direct competition to Adobe Illustrator, Adobe's flagship vector-graphics editor. The Federal Trade Commission (FTC) intervened and forced Adobe to sell FreeHand back to Altsys, and also banned Adobe from buying back FreeHand or any similar program for the next 10 years (1994–2004). Altsys was then bought by Macromedia, which released versions 5 to 11. When Adobe acquired Macromedia in December 2005, it stalled development of FreeHand in 2007, effectively rendering it obsolete. With FreeHand and Illustrator, Adobe controlled the only two products that competed in the professional illustration program market for Macintosh operating systems.

In 2011, a group of 5,000 FreeHand graphic designers convened under the banner Free FreeHand, and filed a civil antitrust complaint in the US District Court for the Northern District of California against Adobe. The suit alleged that:

Adobe has violated federal and state antitrust laws by abusing its dominant position in the professional vector graphic illustration software market [...] Adobe has engaged in a series of exclusionary and anti-competitive acts and strategies designed to kill FreeHand, the dominant competitor to Adobe's Illustrator software product, instead of competing on the basis of product merit according to the principals of free market capitalism.

Adobe had no response to the claims and the lawsuit was eventually settled. The FreeHand community believes Adobe should release the product to an open-source community if it cannot update it internally.

As of 2010, on its FreeHand product page, Adobe stated, "While we recognize FreeHand has a loyal customer base, we encourage users to migrate to the new Adobe Illustrator CS4 software which supports both PowerPC and Intel–based Macs and Microsoft Windows XP and Windows Vista." As of 2016, the FreeHand page no longer exists; instead, it simply redirects to the Illustrator page. Adobe's software FTP server still contains a directory for FreeHand, but it is empty.

=== Cancellation fees ===
In April 2021, Adobe received criticism from Twitter users for the company's cancellation fees after a customer shared a tweet showing they had been charged a $291.45 cancellation fee for their Adobe Creative Cloud subscription. Many also showed their cancellation fees for Adobe Creative Cloud, with this leading to many encouraging piracy of Adobe products and/or purchase of alternatives with lower prices or using free and open-source software instead. Furthermore, there have been reports that with changing subscriptions it is possible to avoid paying this fee.

The U.S. Department of Justice and the FTC filed a lawsuit against Adobe and two of its executives in June 2024, alleging that the company's deceptive subscription practices and cancellation policies violated the Restore Online Shoppers' Confidence Act. According to the lawsuit, the company purportedly used small text disclosures, optional input fields, and complex web of links to obscure a concealed early termination fee. This fee reportedly amounted to fifty percent of the remaining value of annual contracts for users who chose to cancel early in the first year, resulting in significant penalties. Customers who tried to cancel services by contacting customer service faced obstacles, including dropped calls and multiple transfers between representatives; others continued to be billed by Adobe, under the mistaken belief that they had successfully ended their subscriptions.

In March 2026, Adobe agreed to pay $75 million to settle a lawsuit with the U.S. Department of Justice over allegations that the company failed to clearly disclose cancellation fees associated with its subscription plans.

=== 2024 terms of service update ===
On June 5, 2024, Adobe updated its terms of service (TOS) for Photoshop stating "we may access your content through both manual and automated methods, such as for content review." This sparked outrage with Adobe users, as the new terms implied that the users' work would be used to train Adobe's generative AI, even if the work was under a non-disclosure agreement (NDA).

Adobe responded the following day clarifying that it will not use user data to train generative AI or take users' work as its own; however, it neglected to respond to the part in the TOS that gives Adobe the ability to view or use work that is contracted under an NDA.

== See also ==
- Adobe MAX
- Digital rights management (DRM)
- List of acquisitions by Adobe
- United States v. Elcom Ltd.
