= List of Adobe software =

The following is a list of software products by Adobe Inc.

== Active products ==
Product name	Latest major version	Available in	Supported OS
Acrobat family
Adobe Acrobat	DC	Standalone package Creative Suite; Creative Cloud; Technical Communication Suite	Windows, macOS, web
Acrobat Distiller	DC	Standalone package	Windows, macOS, web
Adobe Document Cloud	N/A	Standalone package	Web
Acrobat Export PDF	N/A	Standalone package	Windows, macOS
Acrobat PDF Pack	N/A	Standalone package	Windows, macOS
Acrobat Reader	DC	Standalone package	Windows, macOS, Android, iOS, Windows Phone, web
Adobe Sign	N/A	Standalone package	Web
Experience Cloud family
Advertising Cloud	N/A	Experience Cloud	Android, iOS, web
Analytics	N/A	Experience Cloud	Android, iOS, web
Audience Manager	N/A	Experience Cloud	Web
Campaign	Varies with platform	Experience Cloud	Web
Exchange	N/A	Experience Cloud	Web
Experience Manager	6.5	Experience Cloud	Windows, macOS, Android, iOS, web
Magento Commerce Cloud	N/A	Experience Cloud	Web
Marketo Engage	N/A	Experience Cloud	Web
Primetime	N/A	Experience Cloud	Web
Target	N/A	Experience Cloud	Web
Workfront	N/A	Experience Cloud	Web
Mobile apps
Account Access	varies with platform	Standalone package	Android, iOS
AIR	varies with platform	Standalone package	Windows, macOS, Android, iOS, BlackBerry
Authenticator	varies with platform	Standalone package	Android, iOS
Captivate Draft	1.0.12	Standalone package	iOS
Captivate Prime	varies with platform	Standalone package Technical Communication Suite	Android, iOS
Adobe Capture	varies with platform	Standalone package Creative Cloud	Android, iOS
Connect	varies with platform	Standalone package	Windows, macOS, Android, iOS, BlackBerry
DPS Learn	32.6	Standalone package	iOS
Fill & Sign DC	varies with platform	Standalone package	Android, iOS
Fresco	2.0.3	Standalone package Creative Cloud	Windows, iOS
Illustrator Draw	varies with platform	Standalone package Creative Cloud	Android, iOS
Photoshop Camera	varies with platform	Standalone package Creative Cloud	Android, iOS
Photoshop Fix	varies with platform	Standalone package Creative Cloud	Android, iOS
Photoshop Mix	varies with platform	Standalone package Creative Cloud	Android, iOS
Photoshop Sketch	varies with platform	Standalone package Creative Cloud	Android, iOS
Prelude Live Logger	1.1.1	Standalone package Creative Cloud	iOS
Scan	varies with platform	Standalone package	Android, iOS
Spark Page	3.1.0	Standalone package Creative Cloud	iOS
Creative Cloud Express	3.8.3	Standalone package Creative Cloud	Web, Android, iOS
Spark Video	2.1.4	Standalone package Creative Cloud	iOS
Project Indigo	varies with platform	Standalone package	iOS
Photoshop family
Camera Raw	v 15.5	Standalone package Creative Cloud	Windows, macOS
DNG Converter	18	Standalone package	Windows, macOS
DNG Profile Editor	1.0.4	Standalone package	Windows, macOS
Lens Profile Creator	1.0.4	Standalone package	Windows, macOS
Lightroom	CC (v 5.0)	Standalone package Creative Suite; Creative Cloud	Windows, macOS, Android, iOS, web
Photoshop	2024 (25.9.1)	Standalone package Creative Suite; Creative Cloud eLearning Suite	Windows, macOS, iOS, web
Photoshop Elements	2024 (24.0)	Standalone package	Windows, macOS
Photoshop Elements Organizer	2020	Standalone package	Windows, macOS
Photoshop Express		www.photoshop.com	Windows, Android, iOS
Technical Communication Suite family
Captivate	9.0	Standalone package Technical Communication Suite	Windows, macOS
FrameMaker	12	Standalone package Technical Communication Suite	Windows, macOS
FrameMaker Publishing Server		Standalone package Technical Communication Suite	Web
Presenter	11	Standalone package Technical Communication Suite	Windows, macOS
Presenter Video Express	11	Standalone package Technical Communication Suite	Windows, macOS
RoboHelp	10	Standalone package Technical Communication Suite	Windows, macOS
RoboHelp Classic	10	Standalone package Technical Communication Suite	Windows, macOS
RoboHelp Server	10	Standalone package Technical Communication Suite	Web
Premiere family
Premiere Elements	12	Standalone package	Windows, macOS
Premiere Pro	CC (2021) (v 22.6.2)	Standalone package Creative Suite; Creative Cloud	Windows, macOS
Premiere Rush	CC (2020)	Standalone; Creative Cloud	Windows, macOS, Android, iOS
Type family
Font Development Kit for OpenType	3.2.0	Standalone package	Web
Font Folio	11.1	Standalone package	Web
Fonts (formerly Typekit)	N/A	Standalone package Creative Cloud	Web
Creative Cloud family
Aero		Standalone package Creative Cloud	Windows, macOS, Android, iOS
After Effects	CC 2021 (v 22.6)	Standalone package Creative Suite; Creative Cloud	Windows, macOS
Animate (formerly Flash Professional)	CC 2021 (21.0.1)	Standalone package Creative Suite (eLearning Suite); Creative Cloud	Windows, macOS
Audition	CC 2023 (v 23.0.0.54)	Standalone package Creative Suite (eLearning Suite); Creative Cloud	Windows, macOS
Behance	N/A	Standalone package Creative Cloud	Android, iOS, watchOS, tvOS
Bridge	2023 (v 13.0.0.562)	Creative Suite eLearning Suite; Creative Cloud	Windows, macOS
Character Animator	CC 2021 (v 4.4)	Standalone package Creative Cloud	Windows, macOS
Color (formerly Kuler)	N/A	Standalone package Creative Cloud	Web
Creative Cloud		Standalone package Creative Cloud	Windows, macOS, Android, iOS, web
Dimension		Standalone package Creative Cloud	Windows, macOS
Dreamweaver	CC 2021 (21.2)	Standalone package Creative Suite eLearning Suite; Creative Cloud	Windows, macOS
Dynamic Link		Standalone package Creative Cloud; Creative Suite	Windows, macOS
ExtendScript Toolkit	CC	Standalone package Creative Cloud	Windows, macOS
Express	2023 (v 11.19.0)	Creative Cloud Standalone package	Windows, macOS, Android, iOS, web
Fresco	2.0.3	Standalone package Creative Cloud	Windows, iOS
Illustrator	CC 2023 (v 27.0)	Standalone package Creative Cloud; Creative Suite	Windows, macOS, iOS (iPad only)
InCopy	CC 2023 (v. 18.1)	Standalone package Creative Cloud; Creative Suite	Windows, macOS
InDesign	CC 2023 (18.0)	Standalone package Creative Cloud; Creative Suite	Windows, macOS, Web
Lightroom	CC (v 5.0)	Standalone package Creative Cloud; Creative Suite	Windows, macOS, Android, iOS, web
Lightroom Classic	CC (v 5.0)	Photography plan Creative Cloud	Windows, macOS
Media Encoder	2021 (v 22.6)	Creative Cloud; Creative Suite	Windows, macOS
Photoshop	2023 (24.0.0)	Standalone package Creative Suite; Creative Cloud eLearning Suite	Windows, macOS, iOS (iPad only)
Portfolio	N/A	Standalone package Creative Cloud	Web
Premiere Pro	CC (2021) (v 22.6.2)	Standalone package Creative Suite; Creative Cloud	Windows, macOS
Premiere Rush	CC (2020)	Standalone; Creative Cloud	Windows, macOS, Android, iOS
Stock	N/A	Standalone; Creative Cloud	Web
XD	45.0.62	Standalone; Creative Cloud	Windows, macOS, Android, iOS
Substance 3D family
Substance 3D Designer		Substance 3D	Windows, macOS
Substance 3D Modeler	Open Beta	Substance 3D	Windows, macOS
Substance 3D Painter		Substance 3D	Windows, macOS
Substance 3D Sampler		Substance 3D	Windows, macOS
Substance 3D Stager		Substance 3D	Windows, macOS
Other products
Brackets	2.1.2	brackets.io	Windows, macOS
Business Catalyst	2.0	Standalone package	Web
ColdFusion	2018	Standalone package	Windows, macOS
ColdFusion Builder	2018	Standalone package	Windows, macOS
Content Server	4	Standalone package	Web
Content Viewer		Standalone package	Windows
Extension Builder	3	Standalone package	Windows, macOS
Media Optimizer			Web
Medium by Adobe	N/A	Standalone package	Web
Source Libraries			Web
Adobe Podcast			Web

== Software suites ==
=== Experience Cloud ===
Adobe Experience Cloud (AEC) is a collection of integrated online marketing and Web analytics solutions by Adobe Inc. It includes a set of analytics, social, advertising, media optimization, targeting, Web experience management and content management solutions. It includes:

- Advertising Cloud
- Analytics
- Audience Manager
- Campaign
- Commerce Cloud
- Experience Manager
  - Experience Manager Assets
  - Experience Manager Sites
  - Experience Manager Forms
- Marketo Engage
- Primetime
- Target

=== Creative Suite ===
Adobe Creative Suite (CS) was a series of software suites of graphic design, video editing, and web development applications made or acquired by Adobe Systems. It included:

- Acrobat
- After Effects
- Audition
- Bridge
- Contribute
- Device Central
- Dreamweaver
- Dynamic Link
- Encore
- Fireworks
- Flash Professional
- Illustrator
- InDesign
- OnLocation
- Photoshop
- Premiere Pro

=== Creative Cloud ===
Adobe Creative Cloud is the successor to Creative Suite. It is based on a software as a service model. It includes everything in Creative Suite 6 with the exclusion of Fireworks and Encore, as both applications were discontinued. It also introduced a few new programs, including Muse, Animate, InCopy and Story CC Plus.

=== Technical Communication Suite ===
Adobe Technical Communication Suite is a collection of applications made by Adobe Systems for technical communicators, help authors, instructional designers, and eLearning and training design professionals. It includes:

- Acrobat
- Captivate
- FrameMaker
- Presenter
- RoboHelp

=== eLearning Suite ===
Adobe eLearning Suite was a collection of applications made by Adobe Systems for learning professionals, instructional designers, training managers, content developers, and educators.

- Acrobat
- Captivate
- Device Central
- Dreamweaver
- Flash Professional
- Photoshop

== Discontinued products ==
- Adobe Animator is on this list as of March 1st, 2026.
- Acrobat Approval allows users to deploy electronic forms based on the Acrobat Portable Document Format (PDF).
- Acrobat Capture is a document processing utility for Windows from Adobe Systems that converts a scan of any paper document into a PDF file with selectable text through OCR technology.
- Adobe Comp was mobile page layout and design tool.
- Acrobat Elements was a very basic version of the Acrobat family that was released by Adobe Systems. Its key feature advantage over the free Adobe Acrobat Reader was the ability to create reliable PDF files from Microsoft Office applications.
- Adobe Design Collection was an early software suite from Adobe Systems, first released on July 30, 1999. It included applications such as Acrobat, Illustrator, InDesign, and Photoshop.
- Acrobat InProduction is a pre-press tools suite for Acrobat released by Adobe in 2000 to handle color separation and pre-flighting of PDF files for printing.
- Acrobat Messenger is a document utility for Acrobat users that was released by Adobe Systems in 2000 to convert paper documents into PDF files that can be e-mailed, faxed, or shared online.
- ActiveShare is a discontinued photo-sharing platform distributed by Adobe Systems. The Photoshop Album application replaced ActiveShare in 2003.
- Adobe Graphics Server, formerly Adobe AlterCast, was server-based asset management software from Adobe Systems for version tracking of graphics assets in production workflows.
- Atmosphere was a software platform for interacting with 3D computer graphics.
- Authorware was an interpreted, flowchart-based, graphical programming language.
- BrowserLab was a service that enabled cross-browser testing by producing screenshots of websites from various web browsers across different platforms (Windows and OS X are currently supported).
- Central was a runtime environment developed by Macromedia (now just Adobe since being acquired) for developing application software that runs on different operating systems and are distributed over the Internet.
- Collage is a collage maker once distributed by Adobe Systems, until being replaced by Adobe Spark or Adobe Photoshop.
- Contribute is a discontinued specialized HTML editor. As its name implies, it is intended to contribute content to existing websites, including blogs.
- Cool Edit Pro was an audio editing application from Syntrillium Software (now acquired by Adobe) that was the predecessor to Adobe Audition.
- Creative Mark
- Debut is software used to share your work on tablet devices.
- Device Central is a software program created and released by Adobe Systems as a part of the Adobe Creative Suite 3 (CS3) in March 2007.
- Dimensions was a 3D modeling and rendering program that was sold by Adobe Systems in the 1990s. It had the unique ability to export to PostScript files. Years after the discontinuation of Dimensions, Adobe released Dimension CC.
- Director was a multimedia application authoring platform created by Macromedia and managed by Adobe Systems until its discontinuation.
- Displaytalk was a Display PostScript debugger and development environment created by Emerald City Software and distributed by Adobe Systems.
- Dreamweaver Extension
- Drive was a utility for accessing Adobe Systems' cloud-based asset workflow service.
- DS Community Edition
- DV Rack is a suite of video recording and monitoring tools that turns videographers' laptop computers into portable digital video recorders, field monitors and video signal evaluation processors.
- Edge is a suite of web development tools developed by Adobe that enhances the capabilities of their other applications, such as Dreamweaver.
- Encore (discontinued in CC) is a DVD authoring software tool produced by Adobe Systems and targeted at professional video producers.
- Extreme was PDF-based printing technology that was developed by Adobe Systems and released in 1996 for service bureaus, prepress shops, and commercial printers.
- Fireworks (discontinued in CC) is a discontinued bitmap and vector graphics editor, which Adobe acquired in 2005.
- Flash Catalyst (formerly known by its codename Thermo) is a designers' tool for creating the user interface for Rich Web Applications (also known as Rich Internet Applications).
- Flash Media Live Encoder (FMLE) was a free live encoding software product from Adobe Systems. It was available for Microsoft Windows and Mac OS.
- FlashPaper was a software application developed by Blue Pacific Software before its acquisition by Macromedia, which was later acquired by Adobe Systems.
- Flash Player (also called Shockwave Flash in Internet Explorer, Firefox, and Google Chrome) was computer software for content created on the Adobe Flash platform.
- Flash Professional (now Adobe Animate) is Flash's content authoring application.
- Form Manager was a form managing tool from Adobe which was replaced by Adobe Experience Manager Forms.
- FrameMaker XML Author was an XML/DITA authoring tool from Adobe, based on the XML Author mode from the corresponding full version of FrameMaker.
- FreeHand was a computer application for creating two-dimensional vector graphics oriented primarily to professional illustration, desktop publishing and content creation for the Web.
- Fuse, formerly Fuse Character Creator, is a 3D character animation application originally developed by Mixamo. It was acquired by Adobe Systems in June 2015 and was discontinued while in beta testing.
- GoLive was a WYSIWYG HTML editor and web site management application from Adobe Systems.
- HomePublisher was a basic page layout application that was marketed by Adobe Systems.
- HomeSite was an HTML editor originally developed by Nick Bradbury. Unlike WYSIWYG HTML editors such as FrontPage and Dreamweaver, HomeSite was designed for direct editing, or "hand coding", of HTML and other website languages.
- Ideas for Android is a mobile digital sketchpad app that lets you design almost anywhere using vectors, layers, and color themes.
- Illustrator Line
- ImageReady is a discontinued bitmap graphics editor that was shipped with Adobe Photoshop for six years. It was available for Windows, Classic Mac OS and Mac OS X from 1998 to 2007. ImageReady was designed for web development and closely interacted with Photoshop.
- ImageStyler was a product created by Adobe Systems released in 1998 until 2000 and was replaced by LiveMotion.
- InContext Editing is an online service that allows clients make their own content updates, while enabling designers maintain the integrity of their Dreamweaver-built website.
- JRun is a J2EE application server, originally developed in 1997 as a Java Servlet engine by Live Software and subsequently purchased by Allaire, who brought out the first J2EE compliant version.
- LaserTalk
- LeanPrint is enterprise-class, printing software that dramatically reduces print costs by using an innovative method to reformat the layout of documents when printing from popular applications and browsers.
- LiveMotion was a product created by Adobe Systems released in 2000 and perceived as a direct competitor to Macromedia Flash.
- Media Gateway is a component to Adobe Connect Universal Voice for sending and receiving audio from a SIP server.
- Media Player is a discontinued desktop media player that allowed users to manage and interact with their media content, and allowed content publishers to define branding and advertising in and around their content.
- Muse is a discontinued offline website builder used to create fixed, fluid, or adaptive websites, without the need to write code. It was discontinued in the CC 2018 version of Muse
- NetAverages was an online service from Adobe Systems that provided internet trend data to design online content for broad audiences across multiple screen formats.
- OnLocation (formerly Serious Magic DV Rack) was a program that is included with Adobe Premiere Pro to log physical media information and to tag ingested media with metadata. It was replaced by Adobe Prelude in Adobe Creative Suite 6.
- Ovation is a presentation software developed by Adobe Systems, originally released by Serious Magic Inc.
- PageMaker (formerly Aldus PageMaker) is a discontinued desktop publishing computer program introduced in 1985 by the Aldus Corporation on the Apple Macintosh.
- PageMill is a WYSIWYG HTML editor developed by Adobe Systems.
- PDF JobReady, formerly PDF Transit, was a software development kit released by Adobe Systems that allowed OEMs to build a workflow to let users generate PDF files that can be transmitted directly over the internet to a print shop.
- PDF Scan
- Persuasion (formerly Aldus Persuasion) is a discontinued presentation program developed for the Macintosh platform by Aldus Corporation.
- PhoneGap Build is a mobile application development framework created by Nitobi (now owned by Adobe Systems) for cross-platform mobile app development. It enables software programmers to build hybrid web applications for mobile devices using CSS3, HTML5, and JavaScript, instead of relying on platform-specific APIs. It was discontinued on October 1, 2020.
- PhoneGap Developer is a testing utility for web developers and designers using the PhoneGap framework. Users can connect to the PhoneGap desktop app to instantly view and test projects on their device.
- PhotoDeluxe was a consumer-oriented image editing software line published by Adobe Systems from 1996 until July 8, 2002. At that time it was replaced by Adobe's newly launched consumer-oriented image editing software Photoshop Elements.
- Photoshop Album is a piece of application software by Adobe Systems designed to import, organize and edit digital photos, and allows quick and easy searching and sharing of entire photo collections.
- Prelude was an ingest and logging tool for tagging media with metadata for searching, post-production workflows, and footage lifecycle management made to work closely with Adobe Premiere Pro. It has been discontinued from September 8, 2021, although support will continue until September 8, 2024.
- Premiere Clip is a professional video editing mobile application. It was replaced by Premiere Rush in April 2016.
- Premiere Express was a rich Internet application for simple editing of digital video files. The release was announced on February 21, 2007.
- Premiere Limited Edition (LE) was a video editor for novice video editors and hobbyists. It contains most of the features of the professional version but with fewer and simpler options. It was instead replaced by Premiere Elements in September 2004.
- PressReady was a software PostScript 3 rasterizer developed by Adobe Systems to allow printing of PostScript documents to color inkjet printers without such capabilities.
- PressWise was digital imposition software to quickly and easily impose most any variety of flat and folding layouts.
- Preview CC is a discontinued mobile app used to preview mobile designs.
- Proto is an iOS-only application that allows users to create wireframes of websites and apps.
- Publish, formerly Omniture Publish, was an on-demand web content management system that was originally developed by Omniture, which was acquired by Adobe in October 2009.
- Revel is a discontinued photo-sharing service that bring photos and videos together, share them privately, preserve them forever, and delight in reliving memories.
- RoboInfo
- RoboPDF
- RoboSourceControl
- Scout is a profiling tool for Flash SWF files.
- Secure Content Servers
- Shockwave (formerly Macromedia Shockwave) is a discontinued multimedia platform for building interactive multimedia applications and video games.
- Social
- Soundbooth is a discontinued digital audio editor by Adobe Systems Incorporated for Windows XP, Windows Vista, 7 and Mac OS X.
- Speedgrade was a professional color correction application that was developed and marketed by Adobe.
- Studio was an online web-based resource operated by Adobe Systems for web, print, digital imaging, and digital video professionals. It was later superseded by Adobe Design Center.
- Stock Photos (now Adobe Stock) is a stock image database that was originally integrated with Adobe Bridge in Adobe Creative Suite 2 and 3.
- Story is a discontinued collaborative script development tool from Adobe Systems Inc. It included scheduling tools, allowing schedules to be created from one or many scripts.
- Streamline is a discontinued line tracing program developed and published by Adobe Systems. Its primary purpose is to convert scanned bitmaps into vector artwork.
- SVG Viewer was a plug-in from Adobe Systems that allowed SVG (Scalable Vector Graphics) files to be viewed on a web browser.
- Type Manager was the name of a family of computer programs created and marketed by Adobe Systems for use with their PostScript Type 1 fonts. The last release was Adobe ATM Light 4.1.2, per Adobe's FTP (at the time).
- Type on Call was an on-demand typeface library distributed by Adobe Systems on CD-ROM.
- Ultra (formerly Serious Magic Ultra) is a discontinued vector keying application, helping produce blue-screen/green-screen effects for video (although the background can actually be any color).
- Version Cue was revision control software from Adobe Systems that enabled users to track files through file metadata.
- Visual Communicator is a Windows-based video-broadcasting software that enables teachers, lecturers and students to create presentation videos by using graphics, audio, and special effects and present in email, the Internet, a CD or DVD, or over a Closed-Circuit System.
- Vlog It!
- Voco is an unreleased audio editing and generating prototype software by Adobe that enables novel editing and generation of audio.

== Adobe Certified Expert ==
An Adobe Certified Expert (ACE) is a person who has demonstrated proficiency with Adobe Systems software products by passing one or more product-specific proficiency exams set by Adobe.

== See also ==
- Creative Cloud controversy
- Macromedia, a company Adobe acquired
