= Adobe Creative Suite =

Discontinued software suite

- Developer: Adobe Systems
- Release: September 29, 2003; 23 years ago
- Final release: Creative Suite 6 / May 7, 2012; 14 years ago
- Operating system: Microsoft Windows, OS X
- Platform: IA-32 (some applications 64-bit only beginning with CS5) PowerPC (up to CS4; some applications Intel-only in CS3 and CS4) x86-64 (some applications beginning with CS4)
- Successor: Adobe Creative Cloud
- Type: Digital media creation and editing
- License: Proprietary
- Website: www.adobe.com/products/cs6.html

Adobe Creative Suite (CS) is a discontinued set of software suites containing various applications targeted at photographers, artists, designers, filmmakers, programmers, and other digital media disciplines, developed by Adobe Systems.

The Creative Suite product line replaced several earlier "collection" bundles previously sold by Adobe and saw the introduction of a unified brand across its included applications.

In March 2013, it was reported that Adobe would no longer sell boxed copies of the Creative Suite software, instead offering digital downloads and monthly subscriptions. Later, on May 6, 2013, Adobe announced that Creative Suite 6 would be the final version released, shifting their focus to the subscription Creative Cloud product.

== Applications ==
Adobe sold Creative Suite-branded applications standalone, and in several different combinations called "editions". The final version, Adobe Creative Suite 6, was sold in four editions:

- Design Standard containing the core applications Photoshop, Illustrator, InDesign, and Acrobat.
- Design & Web Premium which was a superset of the Design Standard edition, adding Flash, Dreamweaver, and other applications for website designers and web app developers.
- Production Premium, containing headline applications Premiere Pro, After Effects, and Audition, alongside other applications targeted at audiovisual media post-production.
- Master Collection, which bundled all applications included in the other editions.

The following table shows the different details of the core applications in the various Adobe Creative Suite versions and editions.

Product name	CS version	Available in	Transitioned to Creative Cloud
Acrobat	since CS	All editions except Standard (CS and CS2); Web Standard and Production Premium (CS3 onwards)	Moved to separate Adobe Document Cloud product
After Effects	since CS3	Production Premium, Master Collection	Yes
Audition	since CS5.5	Production Premium, Master Collection	Yes
Bridge	since CS2	All editions	Yes
Contribute	from CS3 until CS5.5	Web Standard, Web Premium, Master Collection	No, discontinued
Device Central	from CS3 until CS5.5	All editions	No, discontinued
Dreamweaver	since CS3	Premium (CS2.3), all editions except Design Standard and Production Premium (CS3 onwards)	Yes
Dynamic Link	since Production Studio Premium (2006)	Production Studio Premium (2006); Production Premium, Master Collection (CS3 onwards)	Yes
Encore (formerly Encore DVD)	since Production Studio Premium (2006)	Production Studio Premium (2006); Production Premium, Master Collection (CS3 onwards)	No, discontinued
Fireworks	since CS3	All editions except Design Standard and Production Premium (CS3.3 onwards); not included in original CS3 Design Premium edition	No, discontinued
Flash Builder	since CS5	Web Premium and Master Collection	Discontinued in 2019
Flash Catalyst	from CS5 until CS5.5	All editions except Design Standard	No, discontinued
Flash Professional	since CS3	All editions except Design Standard	Renamed to "Animate" in 2015; development of new features stopped in 2026
GoLive	until CS2	Premium (CS and CS2)	No, replaced by Dreamweaver
Illustrator	since CS	All editions except Production Studio Standard (2006) and Web Standard	Yes
ImageReady	until CS2	All editions (part of Photoshop until CS3)	No, some features merged into Photoshop; otherwise replaced by Fireworks
InCopy	Standalone product never included in a Creative Suite edition		Yes
InDesign	since CS	All editions except Production Studio editions (2006), and Web Standard and Production Premium (CS3 onwards)	Yes
Lightroom	Standalone product never included in a Creative Suite edition		Yes
Media Encoder	since CS5.5	All editions	Yes
OnLocation	from CS3 until CS5.5	Production Premium, Master Collection	No, replaced by Prelude
Photoshop	since CS	All editions (until CS3); in CS3 onwards, Design Standard only (all other editions include Photoshop Extended, except Web Standard which does not include any version of Photoshop)	Yes
Photoshop Extended	since CS3	All editions except Design Standard and Web Standard	No - this was an edition of Photoshop containing extra features; these were merged into the standard application with Creative Cloud
Prelude	since CS6	Production Premium, Master Collection	Removed in 2021, features merged into Premiere Pro
Premiere Pro	since CS3	Production Premium, Master Collection	Yes
Soundbooth	from CS3 to CS5	Production Premium, Master Collection	Replaced by Audition
SpeedGrade	CS6 only	Production Premium, Master Collection	Discontinued in 2017, Premiere Pro contains its functionality in its Lumetri Color panel since 2014
Stock Photos	until CS3	All editions	Discontinued in 2008; similar Adobe Stock service launched in 2015
Story Plus	Standalone product never included in a Creative Suite edition		Discontinued in 2019
Ultra	CS3 only	Production Premium, Master Collection	No, discontinued
Version Cue	from CS to CS4	All editions	No, discontinued

== History ==
=== Creative Suite and Creative Suite 2 ===
The Adobe Creative Suite 2 logo

The first version of Adobe Creative Suite was released in September 2003, and Creative Suite 2 in April 2005. The first two versions of the Creative Suite were available in two editions.

The Standard edition included:

- Photoshop
- ImageReady
- Illustrator
- InDesign
- Version Cue
- Adobe Stock Photos (discontinued in 2008)
- Bridge (introduced in Creative Suite 2)

The Premium edition adds Acrobat and GoLive.

Creative Suite Production Studio was a separate product line for Windows only, sold alongside Creative Suite 2. Its Standard edition consisted of:

- After Effects Standard
- Bridge
- Premiere Pro
- Photoshop

The Premium edition upgraded After Effects to the Professional edition and added the following applications:

- Audition
- Encore DVD
- Illustrator
- Dynamic Link

Following Adobe's 2005 acquisition of Macromedia, Adobe introduced a range of bundles adding various Macromedia products to Creative Suite 2 Premium and Creative Suite Production Studio Premium.

On September 18, 2006, Adobe announced Creative Suite 2.3 Premium. This upgraded Acrobat to version 8 and added Macromedia Dreamweaver; Adobe announced that it intended to replace GoLive with Dreamweaver in future versions of the Creative Suite. The Standard edition and Production Studio products were not updated as they did not include Acrobat and GoLive.

==== Shutdown of activation servers ====
Adobe shut down the activation servers for Creative Suite 2, Creative Suite Production Studio, and Acrobat 7 products in December 2012. Adobe subsequently released replacement installers and serial numbers that did not require product activation. Because the software was made available on a public web page without requiring proof of purchase or an Adobe Account, it was widely misreported that the software had become freeware. Adobe released a statement that the activation-free release was intended only for people who had "legitimately purchased" the original software.

=== Creative Suite 3 ===
The Adobe Creative Suite 3 logo

Adobe Creative Suite 3 (CS3) was announced on March 27, 2007.

CS3 integrated the Dreamweaver, Flash Professional and Fireworks applications from the former Macromedia Studio product line into Adobe's Creative Suite branding and user interface design. CS3 introduced OnLocation and Ultra, initially developed by Serious Magic; itself acquired by Adobe in 2006.

Adobe dropped the following programs that were previously included in CS2:

- GoLive, replaced by Dreamweaver
- ImageReady, partly merged into Photoshop and partly replaced by Fireworks
- Audition, replaced by Soundbooth

Adobe had announced that GoLive was to be discontinued, while Audition would be developed separately. GoLive 9, the final version, was released as a standalone product on June 10, 2007. Audition 3 was announced as a standalone product on September 6, 2007; it would later become part of the Creative Suite lineup again in 2011.

For Mac users, CS3 introduced the previously Windows-only Premiere Pro and Encore to the Mac. Those two applications as well as Soundbooth only support Intel Macs. All other applications are universal binaries, supporting PowerPC G4, G5 and Intel Macs. OnLocation is Windows-only; Adobe recommended Mac users to have a separate Windows machine or use Boot Camp to access it.

Adobe sold Creative Suite 3 in six editions. All editions except Production Premium and Master Collection were released on April 16, 2007; those two editions shipped later on July 2, 2007. On June 2, 2008, Adobe released Creative Suite 3.3, a minor update adding Fireworks CS3 to the Design Premium edition and upgrading Acrobat in all editions that shipped it to version 9. The Production Premium edition did not receive this upgrade as it did not include Acrobat.

CS3's activation servers were shut down in 2017. Adobe offered activation-free replacement installers until mid-way through 2019. Unlike with CS2, Adobe required users to sign in with an Adobe Account and register their original serial number in order to access the replacement installers and serial numbers.

Below is a matrix of the applications included in each edition of CS3:

Adobe Creative Suite 3
Software	Design		Web		Production Premium	Master Collection
Software	Standard	Premium	Standard	Premium	Production Premium	Master Collection
Photoshop CS3						
Photoshop CS3 Extended						
Illustrator CS3						
InDesign CS3						
Acrobat 8 Pro						
Flash CS3 Professional						
Dreamweaver CS3						
Fireworks CS3		(in v3.3)				
Contribute CS3						
Soundbooth CS3						
After Effects CS3 Professional						
Premiere Pro CS3						
Encore CS3						
Adobe Dynamic Link						
Shared applications
OnLocation CS3 (Windows only)						
Ultra CS3 (Windows only)						
Bridge CS3						
Device Central CS3						
Stock Photos						
Version Cue CS3						

=== Creative Suite 4 ===
Adobe Creative Suite 4 logo

Adobe Creative Suite 4 (CS4) was announced on September 23, 2008, and officially released on October 15, 2008. Almost all applications in CS4 feature a redesigned, unified user interface.

On Windows, Photoshop was offered as a native 64-bit application that could be installed alongside the 32-bit version. In early testing of 64-bit support in Photoshop CS4, overall performance gains ranged from 8% to 12%, due to the fact that 64-bit applications could address larger amounts of memory. After Effects CS4 and Premiere Pro CS4 included optimizations for 64-bit computers, but were not yet native 64-bit applications.

The Mac version of CS4 did not include any 64-bit applications, and was the last version to include universal binaries. Like in CS3, Premiere Pro, Encore and Soundbooth are Intel-only; After Effects newly became Intel-only in CS4. A native Mac version of OnLocation was introduced in CS4, also for Intel Macs only.

Adobe Ultra was not included in CS4, and the Adobe Stock Photos was discontinued prior to CS4's release.

Unlike prior versions, CS4 did not receive a mid-life upgrade. Its activation servers were taken offline in 2020, and no replacement installer was offered.

Below is a matrix of the applications that were bundled in each of the software suites for CS4:

Adobe Creative Suite 4
Software	Design		Web		Production Premium	Master Collection
Software	Standard	Premium	Standard	Premium	Production Premium	Master Collection
Photoshop CS4						
Photoshop CS4 Extended						
Illustrator CS4						
InDesign CS4						
Acrobat 9 Pro						
Flash CS4 Professional						
Dreamweaver CS4						
Fireworks CS4						
Contribute CS4						
Soundbooth CS4						
After Effects CS4						
Premiere Pro CS4						
OnLocation CS4						
Encore CS4						
Shared features, services, and applications
Bridge CS4						
Device Central CS4						
Version Cue CS4						
Dynamic Link						

=== Creative Suite 5 ===
The Adobe Creative Suite 5 logo

Adobe Creative Suite 5 (CS5) was released on April 30, 2010.

The Windows versions of Adobe Premiere Pro CS5 and Adobe After Effects CS5 became 64-bit only, and require at least Windows Vista. All other applications require at least Windows XP.

The Mac versions of the CS5 programs were significantly rewritten in an effort to modernize the codebase, with all applications now requiring 64-bit Intel Macs.

Adobe Version Cue was removed from the CS5 line-up, and there was no Web Standard edition.

As of November 2026, replacement installers for Adobe CS5 and CS6 still offered.

Below is a matrix of the applications that were bundled in each of the software suites for CS5:

Adobe Creative Suite 5
Software	Design		Web Premium	Production Premium	Master Collection
Software	Standard	Premium	Web Premium	Production Premium	Master Collection
Photoshop CS5					
Photoshop CS5 Extended					
Illustrator CS5					
InDesign CS5					
Acrobat 9.3 Pro					
Flash Catalyst CS5					
Flash Professional CS5					
Flash Builder 4 Standard					
Dreamweaver CS5					
Fireworks CS5					
Contribute CS5					
Premiere Pro CS5					
OnLocation CS5					
Encore CS5					
After Effects CS5					
Soundbooth CS5					
Shared features, services, and applications
Bridge CS5					
Device Central CS5					
CS Live					
Dynamic Link					

=== Creative Suite 5.5 ===
Adobe Creative Suite 5.5 (CS5.5) was announced on April 12, 2011. Unlike previous mid-life upgrades, CS5.5 functioned as a completely separate version and added new features to several applications across the suite, with a focus particularly on newly-popular tablet computers and delivering content on the web with HTML 5, relatively new at the time.

Applications that were upgraded included After Effects, Device Central, Dreamweaver, Flash Catalyst, Flash Professional, InDesign, and Premiere Pro. Acrobat was upgraded from version 9.3 to version X, and Audition replaced Soundbooth. A screenwriting application named Story was introduced as a standalone application, not included in any of the CS5.5 editions.

Below is a matrix of the applications that were bundled in each edition of CS5.5:

Adobe Creative Suite 5.5
Software	Design		Web Premium	Production Premium	Master Collection
Software	Standard	Premium	Web Premium	Production Premium	Master Collection
Photoshop CS5					
Photoshop CS5 Extended					
Illustrator CS5					
InDesign CS5.5					
Acrobat X Pro					
Flash Catalyst CS5.5					
Flash Professional CS5.5					
Flash Builder 4.5 Premium Edition					
Dreamweaver CS5.5					
Fireworks CS5					
Contribute CS5					
Premiere Pro CS5.5					
OnLocation CS5					
Encore CS5					
After Effects CS5.5					
Audition CS5.5					
Shared features, services, and applications
Bridge CS5					
Device Central CS5.5					
Dynamic Link					
Extension Manager CS5.5					
ExtendScript Toolkit CS5.5					
Media Encoder CS5.5					
Extension Manager CS5.5					
Story CS5.5					

=== Creative Suite 6 and discontinuation ===
Adobe Creative Suite 6 (CS6) was launched at a release event April 23, 2012, and began shipping on May 7, 2012. Alongside CS6, Adobe launched its present-day subscription service, Adobe Creative Cloud.

CS6 saw the merger of the previously separate Design Premium and Web Premium editions into one named "Design & Web Premium", and the introduction of new applications SpeedGrade and Prelude. The below matrix lists the applications included in the four editions of CS6:

Adobe Creative Suite 6
Software	Design Standard	Design & Web Premium	Production Premium	Master Collection
Photoshop CS6				
Photoshop CS6 Extended				
Illustrator CS6				
InDesign CS6				
InCopy CS6				
Acrobat X Pro				
Flash Professional CS6				
Flash Builder 4.6 Premium Edition				
Dreamweaver CS6				
Fireworks CS6				
Premiere Pro CS6				
Encore CS6				
After Effects CS6				
Audition CS6				
SpeedGrade CS6				
Prelude CS6				
Shared features, services, and applications
Bridge CS6				
Media Encoder CS6				
Dynamic Link				
Extension Manager CS6				
Extension Toolkit CS6				
Story Plus CS6				

On May 5, 2013, during the opening keynote of its Adobe MAX conference, Adobe announced that it was retiring the "Creative Suite" branding entirely in favor of "Creative Cloud", and making all future feature updates to its software available via the Creative Cloud subscription service; perpetual licenses were to be discontinued. Adobe's decision to make the subscription service the only sales route for its creative software was met with strong criticism.

As subscription software, customers must pay a subscription fee or they will lose access to the applications. It was noted that Creative Cloud's file formats were not entirely backwards-compatible with Creative Suite, potentially causing users who tried Creative Cloud then went back to Creative Suite to lose work.

In addition to many of the products formerly part of the Creative Suite, Creative Cloud also added services and products such as Adobe Muse and the Adobe Edge family, web-based file and website hosting, Typekit fonts, and access to the Behance social media platform.
