= Adobe Device Central =

- Developer(s): Adobe Systems
- Final release: CS5.5 (3.5.0) / October 4, 2011; 13 years ago
- Operating system: Windows and Mac OS X
- Type: Mobile development
- License: Bundled software
- Website: www.adobe.com/products/creativesuite/devicecentral

Adobe Device Central is a software program created and released by Adobe Systems as a part of the Adobe Creative Suite 3 (CS3) in March 2007. Its primary purpose is to integrate parts of the Creative Suite together to offer both professional and individual creative professionals, web designers, and mobile developers an easier way to preview and test Flash Lite, bitmap, web, and video content for mobile devices. It is accessible from all of the Creative Suite editions. The final release accompanied Adobe Creative Suite 5.5 (CS5.5), and it was thereafter discontinued effective April 23, 2012.

Device Central is also included with Adobe Photoshop, Adobe Illustrator, Adobe Fireworks, Adobe Flash Professional, Adobe Dreamweaver, Adobe After Effects, and Adobe Premiere Pro applications.

Device Central provides designers and coders a comprehensive testing facility that approximates how pages and graphics will look on a variety of cell phones with different screen resolutions, color depths, memory constraints, and other performance characteristics. It simplifies the mobile authoring workflow and allows developers to preview designs and test content on the desktop before loading it on the mobile devices for final testing. A library of mobile device profiles on Device Central are updated quarterly, with an initial support for over 200 devices at launch.

Device Central has many other functions such as rescaling graphics, simulating a mobile phone's backlight dimming, adding artificial screen reflections and changing the color balance, allowing artists to tune their graphics in different conditions without extraneous footwork.

Adobe Device Central CS5 introduced several new features including emulation of device's geolocation, accelerometer, and multi-touch features.

== See also ==
- Adobe Creative Suite
- Creative Cloud controversy
