= Adobe Flash Catalyst =

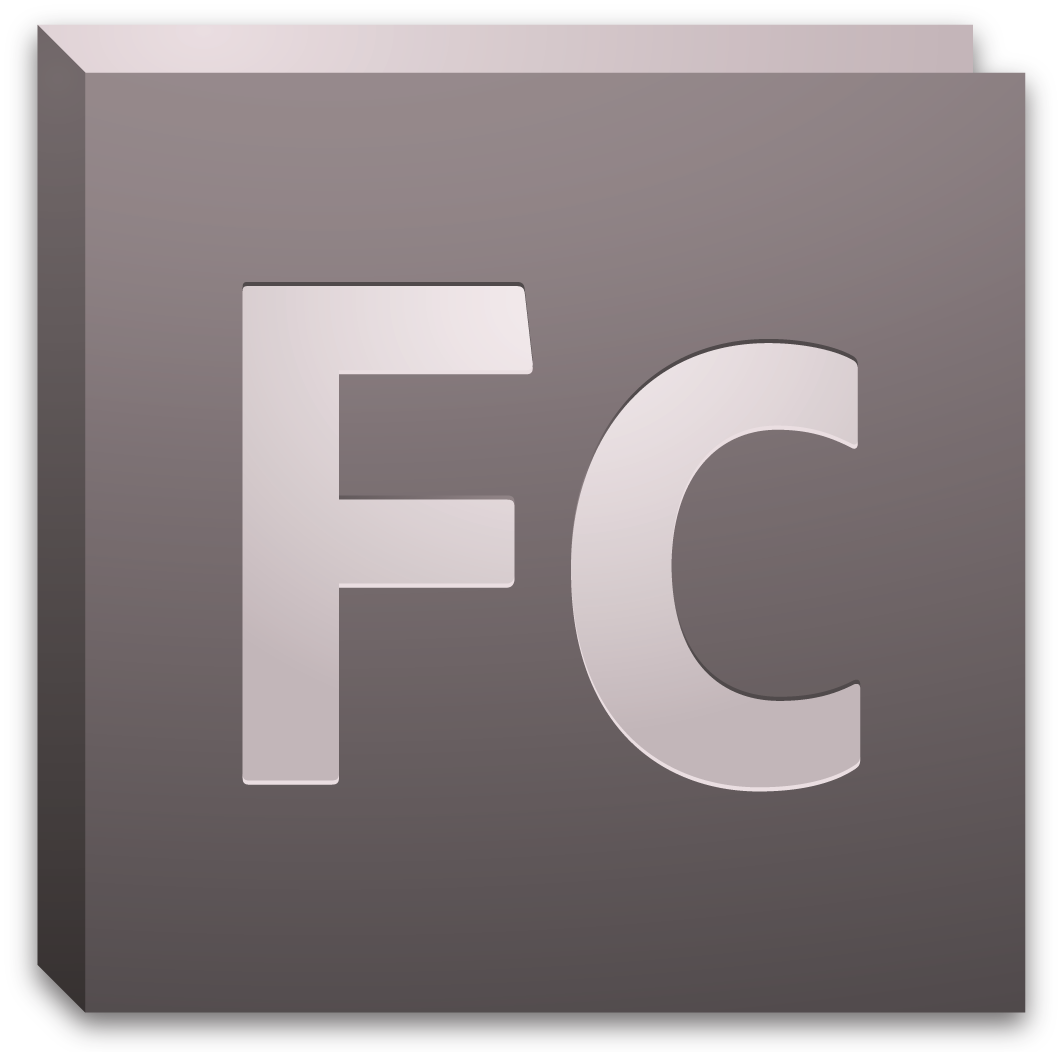
- Developer: Adobe Systems
- Stable release: CS5.5 (1.5) / April 12, 2011; 14 years ago
- Operating system: Mac OS X, Microsoft Windows
- Type: Rich web application
- License: Proprietary commercial software
- Website: www.adobe.com/products/flashcatalyst/

Adobe Flash Catalyst (formerly known by its codename Thermo) is a designers' tool for creating the user interface for rich web applications (formerly known as Rich Internet Applications).

Development and sales of Adobe Flash Catalyst ended on April 23, 2012.

== Features ==
With Flash Catalyst, user interface architects can create the user interface for Adobe Flex (now Adobe Flash Builder 4) applications using Adobe graphics software. Then developers can use the result to build the rest of the application in Flex.

Flash Catalyst can import Adobe Photoshop, Adobe Illustrator, Adobe Fireworks, or Flash XML Graphics (FXG) files keeping all their features. The converted artwork can then be used as functional UI components (creating Flex component skins). After importing, users use simple WYSIWYG techniques to create and edit behaviors (mouse event handling, etc.) without writing code and create animated transitions. Flash Catalyst can also use design-time data placeholders when marking up an application, testing interactivity, and choreographing motion. These placeholders can then be replaced at production-time with final artwork. This same method can be used to create UIs to handle dynamic data without having access to the actual data source.

Imported objects are maintained as linked files, so behaviors created in Flash Catalyst are still maintained even after the original file is edited in its originating program (e.g., Photoshop or Illustrator). Flash Catalyst is also compatible with Adobe Flash Builder (formerly called "Flex Builder"), using the same project format.

In addition to its primary function of being a GUI composer for Adobe Flex components, Flash Catalyst also features a basic code workspace, which consists of a subset of Adobe Flash Builder's panels. Both tools being based on Eclipse, the code editor, project navigator and problems view are basically the same in both products.

== See also ==
- Criticism of Creative Cloud
