= ExtendScript =

- Paradigms: Object-oriented, Scripting
- Developer: Adobe Systems
- Stable release: 4.0.0.1 (CC)
- OS: Windows, macOS
- Filename extensions: .jsx

Major implementations
- ExtendScript Toolkit, Visual Studio Code

ExtendScript is a scripting language and an associated toolkit developed by Adobe Systems, intended for use with Creative Suite and Technical Communication Suite products. It is a dialect of the ECMAScript 3 standard and therefore similar to JavaScript and ActionScript. The toolkit comes bundled with Creative Suite and Technical Communication Suite editions, and can access tools within applications like Photoshop, FrameMaker, InDesign or After Effects for batch-processing projects.
