= Adobe Contribute =

Specialized HTML editor

- Adobe Contribute CS5 icon

- Adobe Contribute CS5 on Windows 7
- Original author: Macromedia
- Developer: Adobe Systems
- Final release: 6.5 / 3 October 2012; 14 years ago
- Operating system: Windows XP, Windows 7, OS X 10.6, OS X 10.7
- Available in: 17 languages
- List of languages English, Brazilian Portuguese, Chinese Simplified (Windows only), Chinese Traditional (Windows only), Czech, Dutch, French, German, Italian, Japanese, Korean (Windows only), Polish, Russian, Spanish, Swedish and Turkish.
- Type: HTML editor
- License: Trialware
- Website: www.adobe.com/products/contribute (redirects to Adobe Captivate)

Adobe Contribute (formerly Macromedia Contribute) is a discontinued specialized HTML editor. As its name implies, it is intended to contribute content to existing websites, including blogs. It includes plug-ins for Internet Explorer and Firefox that allow users to make their contributions from within their web browsers. Unlike its sibling, Adobe Dreamweaver, Contribute is not intended to create a website from scratch or engage in web development or web design.

Contribute operates in a client–server model: the website to which it contributes must support accepting additions or editions from Contribute and be able to verify that the person doing is so actually allowed. Built-in WordPress and Blogger support are available in Contribute. In addition, Adobe Dreamweaver can create contribute-friendly websites.

Contribute is designed to inter-operate with Adobe Dreamweaver and other Adobe products. It was included in the Web Premium and the Master Collection editions of Adobe Creative Suite until version 5.5.

On January 27, 2017, Adobe announced that it was discontinuing Contribute. Sales of Contribute ceased on February 1, 2017.

== See also ==
- Creative Cloud controversy
