= Adobe Player =

Adobe Player may refer to:

== Adobe Systems products ==
- Adobe Flash Player
- Adobe Media Player

== See also ==
- Adobe Systems
- List of Adobe software
