= Basing =

Basing can refer to:

- Old Basing, a village in the English county of Hampshire
  - Basing House, a Tudor palace and castle in Old Basing
- Slicing (interface design), image slicing for web design and interface design
- Seabasing
