= Adobe Lightroom =

Photo editing and management software

- Adobe Lightroom 8.2 running on macOS Sequoia
- Developer: Adobe
- Release: October 18, 2017; 9 years ago (desktop); April 8, 2014; 12 years ago (mobile)

Stable release(s)
- Desktop: 10.0 / November 10, 2026; 0 days ago
- Mobile: 12.0 / November 10, 2026; 0 days ago
- Operating system: Windows 11 v24H2 or later; macOS 15 Sequoia or later; iOS 18.0 or later; Android 8.0 or later
- Type: Image organizer, image processing
- License: Trialware, Proprietary, term
- Website: lightroom.com

Adobe Lightroom Classic

- Adobe Lightroom Classic 14.2 running on macOS Sequoia
- Developer: Adobe
- Release: February 19, 2007; 19 years ago
- Stable release: 16.0 / November 10, 2026; 0 days ago
- Written in: C++, Lua
- Operating system: Windows 11 v24H2 or later; macOS 15 Sequoia or later
- Type: Image organizer, image manipulation
- License: Trialware, Proprietary, term
- Website: adobe.com/products/photoshop-lightroom-classic.html

Adobe Photoshop Lightroom, often shortened to Lightroom, is an image organization and editing application developed by Adobe and licensed as part of the Creative Cloud suite. It is primarily geared towards photographers and provides tools to import, view, organize, tag, edit, and export large numbers of digital images. Lightroom is available on Windows, macOS, iOS, iPadOS, Android, and tvOS (Apple TV). The name Lightroom is a play on the darkrooms used for processing film.

== Overview ==
Lightroom is offered in two versions. The first version, known as Lightroom Classic, stores files locally and has the most extensive set of features. The second version, known simply as Lightroom and formerly known as Lightroom CC, stores uploaded photos and edits on Adobe's cloud servers and allows access through desktop, mobile, and a web browser. Lightroom and Lightroom Classic are two separate programs that store photos and settings separately, although Lightroom Classic supports limited syncing of photos and settings with Lightroom, and Lightroom can edit locally stored files without needing to import them first. Both Lightroom and Lightroom Classic are non-destructive editing software that save edits as parametric instructions, separate from the original image. This allows the user to make changes to the image without any loss in quality and without modifying the original files, in contrast to raster graphics editors such as Photoshop, which save edits directly to the image. When images are exported, a copy of the image with the adjustments is created. Both versions can import photos from a camera or memory card, and allow for keywords, IPTC, XMP, and geolocation metadata to be added. Images can be filtered based on metadata, and organized into user-defined collections and albums. Lightroom and Lightroom Classic are compatible with TIFF, JPEG, PSD, PNG, CMYK (edited in RGB color space), raw image formats, and some video file formats.

Lightroom and Lightroom Classic provide tools specifically tailored to retouching (developing) photographs, including exposure compensation, white balance correction, color grading, tone curve, HSL, crop, distortion correction, vignette removal, sharpening, noise reduction, and red-eye removal. Both versions also offer simpler versions of tools found in Photoshop, such as cloning and healing, tone mapping, and panorama stitching. Layers are not supported, but masking can be used for localized adjustments. Develop settings can be applied as a batch to multiple photos, and saved as a preset for quick access. Presets are interchangeable between both versions of Lightroom and can be shared with other users. Lightroom and Lightroom Classic include several presets that can be used as starting-off points for editing. There is a large market for develop presets geared towards applying a pre-conditioned look. Both versions of Lightroom are closely integrated with Photoshop; users can make adjustments in Lightroom, export the photo into Photoshop for additional pixel-level editing, and then reimport the photo into Lightroom for finishing touches.

Lightroom Classic contains features not present in the cloud-based version of Lightroom, such as virtual copies, creating books and slideshows, proofing photos for print, creating HTML5 web galleries, tethered shooting, and third-party plug-ins. Likewise, while both versions of Lightroom support basic video trimming, the cloud-based version of Lightroom allows for exposure adjustments, white balance, color grading, tone curve, and vignetting in video.

== History ==
In April 2002, veteran developer Mark Hamburg left the Photoshop project and began work on an experimental software sample named PixelToy, which painted image adjustments using snapshots that could later be reversed, similar to the History feature Hamburg had developed for Photoshop. In fall of 2002, Hamburg provided the sample to his friend Jeff Schewe for review, who proposed an application that could process multiple images simultaneously to reduce the workload of digital photographers, who typically took more photographs than film photographers. In December 2002, Hamburg contacted project lead Andrei Herasimchuk, interface designer Sandy Alves, and Photoshop creator Thomas Knoll to start the project. The project was code-named Shadowland, a reference to the 1988 k.d. lang music album of the same name. Hamburg based Shadowland's image processing upon Adobe Camera Raw and built upon its functionality. Several of Hamburg's developments, such as HSL adjustments, parametric tone curves, black and white color adjustments, and split toning, were ported back to Camera Raw. Hamburg, Herasimchuk, Alves, and researcher Grace Kim researched the needs of digital photographers to develop the feature set for Shadowland. Hamburg selected the Adobe ImageReady team, based in Minnesota, to serve as the engineering team for Lightroom. Phil Clevenger, a former associate of Kai Krause, was selected to design an interface for the application that was distinct from Photoshop.

Forty percent of Lightroom is written in the programming language Lua, allowing for public scripting and extensions to be easily developed.

=== Beta development ===
On January 9, 2006, an early version of Lightroom was released to the public as a Macintosh-only public beta, on the Adobe Labs website. This was the first Adobe product released to the general public for feedback during its development.

On June 26, 2006, Adobe announced that it had acquired the technology of Pixmantec, developers of the Rawshooter image processing software, and integrated into Lightroom.

Further beta releases followed. Notable releases included Beta 3 on July 18, 2006, which added support for Microsoft Windows systems. On September 25, 2006, Beta 4 was released, which merged Lightroom into the Photoshop product range.

On January 29, 2007, Adobe announced that Lightroom would ship on February 19, 2007, priced at $US299. The date February 19 was symbolically chosen as the same date Camera Raw and Photoshop were released.

=== Creative Cloud ===
On April 8, 2014, Adobe released a mobile version of Lightroom for iPad, available with a Creative Cloud subscription. On January 15, 2015, Adobe released an Android version alongside Lightroom web, which allowed cloud-based photos to be accessed and edited through a web browser. Photos and edits are saved to the cloud and synced between devices.

On October 18, 2017, Adobe released Lightroom CC as the desktop counterpart to Lightroom for mobile; the older version of Lightroom was subsequently renamed to Lightroom Classic CC. Lightroom CC is a separate application and can be installed alongside Lightroom Classic CC. Lightroom CC can be synced with Lightroom for mobile, with photos and edits available between desktops and mobile devices. Lightroom 6 was the last version of Lightroom that could be obtained with a perpetual license, and received its last update on December 19, 2017. All subsequent versions of Lightroom are only available through an ongoing Creative Cloud subscription. If the subscription is cancelled, Lightroom CC will retain user data for one year, while Lightroom Classic CC can continue to be used indefinitely to organize and export, but not develop, images.

In 2019, Lightroom Classic CC was renamed to Lightroom Classic, and Lightroom CC was renamed to simply Lightroom.

=== Apple TV ===
On July 26, 2016, Adobe launched Lightroom on Apple TV as a photo viewer application for displaying photos uploaded to the cloud-based version of Lightroom.

=== Samsung Galaxy ===
In 2023, Adobe announced that the Expert RAW app on the Samsung Galaxy S23 series would integrate Adobe Lightroom.

== Reception ==
Lightroom garnered positive reviews on launch, with critics praising its streamlined workflow for photographers, intuitive controls and simpler interface compared to Photoshop, non-destructive editing, and unlimited version history. It received criticism for performance issues, poor noise reduction capabilities, and for having underdeveloped print and web export functionality. Macworld compared Lightroom with Apple's Aperture and found Aperture's photo organizational tools to be more capable than Lightroom, while noting that Lightroom's photo editing tools were easier to use than Aperture's.

Lightroom Mobile was praised on launch for its intuitive user interface and performance, but was criticized for lacking features found in the desktop application.

Lightroom CC received mixed reviews on launch. Reviewers praised the simplified user interface, improved performance, and AI-powered image searching and keywording; but criticized the mandatory cloud uploads, missing features compared to Lightroom Classic CC, and the discontinuation of perpetual licenses in favor of subscription-based pricing. The renaming of the original version of Lightroom to Lightroom Classic CC raised concerns that Adobe would discontinue the product in favor of the cloud-based Lightroom CC. Adobe's director of product management Tom Hogarty advised Adobe would not discontinue Lightroom Classic CC and would continue to develop it in parallel with Lightroom CC.

== See also ==
- Comparison of raster graphics editors
