= Adobe VoCo =

Unreleased software

Adobe VoCo is an unreleased audio editing and generating prototype software by Adobe that enables novel editing and generation of audio. Dubbed "Photoshop-for-voice", it was first previewed at the Adobe MAX event in November 2016. The technology shown at Adobe MAX was a preview that could potentially be incorporated into Adobe Creative Cloud. It was later revealed that VoCo was never meant to be released and was meant to be a research prototype.

In 2023, Adobe introduced the ability to edit video by editing an AI-generated transcript of the video in Premiere Pro, demonstrating similar functionality to VoCo.

== Technical details ==
As the demo showed, the software takes approximately 20 minutes of the desired target's speech and generates a sound-alike voice including phonemes that were not present in the target example material. Adobe stated VoCo would lower the cost of audio production.

== Concerns ==
Ethical and security concerns were raised over the ability to alter an audio recording to include words and phrases the original speaker never spoke, and the potential risk to voiceprint biometrics.

Concerns also rose that it may be used in conjunction with:

- Human image synthesis, which has reached such levels of likeness since the early 2000s that distinguishing between a human recorded with a camera and a simulation of a human is very difficult.
- Video manipulation of a person's facial expressions in near real-time using an existing 2D RGB video of them.

== Alternatives ==
Adobe's lack of publicized progress opened opportunities for other projects to build alternative products to VOCO, such as Resemble AI and 15.ai, a real-time text-to-speech tool using artificial intelligence.

WaveNet is a similar but open-source research project at London-based artificial intelligence firm DeepMind, developed independently around the same time as Adobe VoCo.

== See also ==
- 15.ai
- WaveNet
