= Adobe BrowserLab =

- Developer: Adobe Systems
- Stable release: 1.0.0
- Operating system: Mac OS X and Windows
- Website: browserlab.adobe.com

Adobe BrowserLab was a service that enabled cross-browser testing by producing screenshots of websites from various web browsers across different platforms (Windows and OS X were supported at the time of its shutdown). Screenshots could be compared side-by-side or overlaid upon one another, with diagnostic tools to help discover cross-browser differences.

The service could access dynamic pages across the web, or local content via Firebug or Adobe Dreamweaver CS5. The BrowserLab for Firebug extension allowed Firebug users to preview their page (live URL, or local edited source) in BrowserLab. With this procedure, it was possible to use BrowserLab with website material that has not yet been made available online or is protected by a firewall.

== History ==
In 2006, a team of Chicago-based designers and developers, Dean Vukas, Josh Hatwich, Ted Billups and Charles Stevenson conceived and invented MeerMeer, a web site testing tool for web developers and designers. The MeerMeer SaaS application and patent was sold to Adobe Systems, Inc. in December 2007.

BrowserLab was released worldwide in Free Preview June 2009.

On March 13, 2013, BrowserLab was shut down.

== See also ==
- Adobe Dreamweaver
