= Kyle T. Webster =

American artist and writer

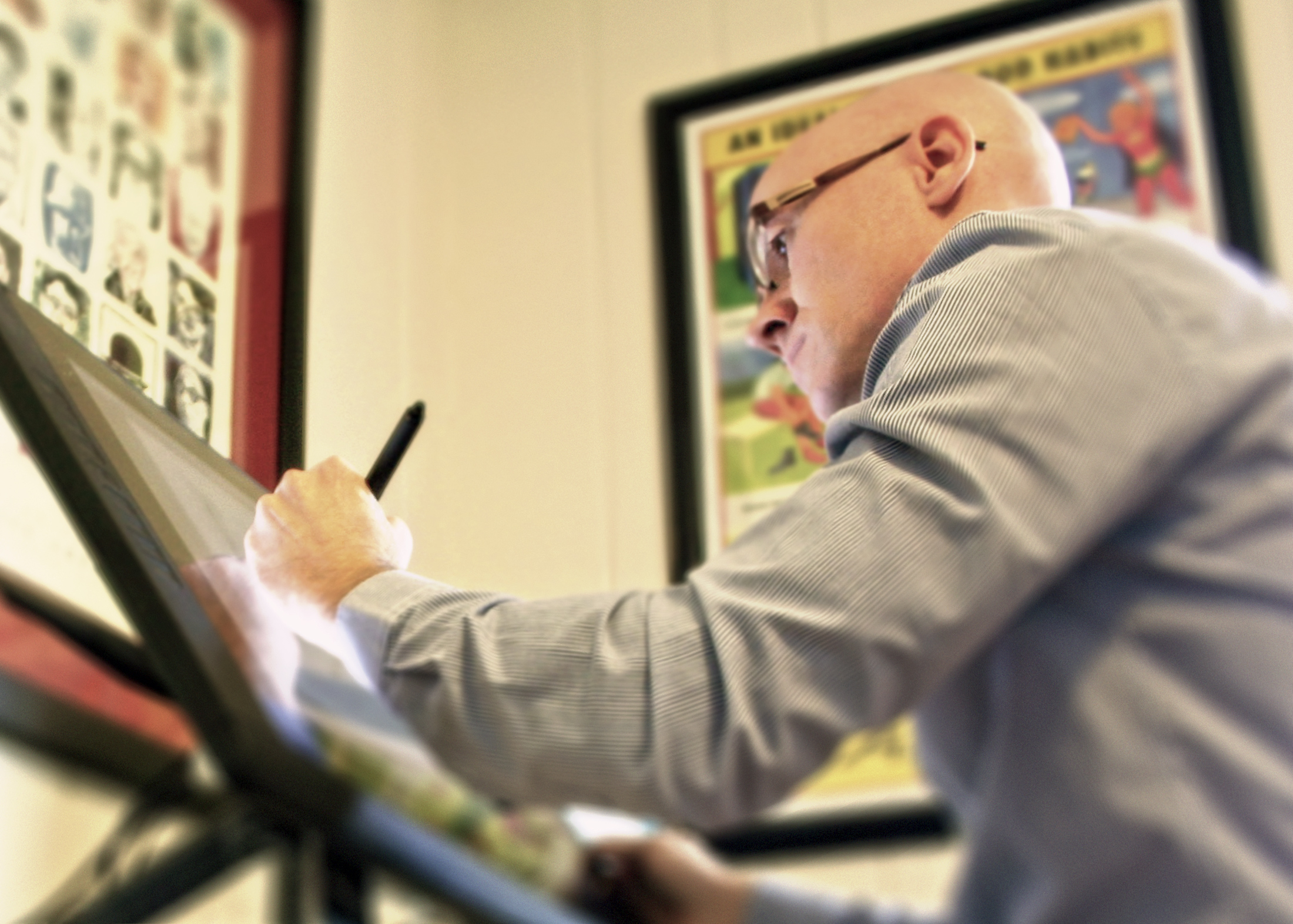
A photo of Kyle T. Webster drawing on a Wacom Cintiq 22HD tablet in his home office in North Carolina.

Kyle T. Webster is an American illustrator, designer, author and educator.

His illustration work has been published in The New Yorker, The New York Times, and other publications.

He is the founder of the KyleBrush brand of Adobe Photoshop brushes that was acquired on October 18, 2017 by Adobe Systems. He worked for Adobe on drawing initiatives until resigning in mid-2024 after publicly criticizing the types of Generative AI being added to Adobe products and just before Adobe announced a change to their Terms of Service that appeared to claim a right to use any work created with their software to train their AI.

Shortly after resigning from Adobe, Procreate developers Savage Interactive announced that Webster had joined them as Brush Developer for their Procreate line of apps

His picture book, "Please Say Please!" was published by Scholastic in July, 2016.

In the summer of 2017, He partnered with Adobe to digitally recreate seven of the original paintbrushes used by Norwegian artist, Edvard Munch, as part of an international competition inviting artists to use these digital brushes to create "The Fifth Scream."

Kyle lives in Winston-Salem, North Carolina with his wife, Sonja Webster, who founded the women's social and professional networking platform, "The Ladies Tea" in 2007, and his 2 children.
