= Adobe Encore =

DVD authoring software tool

Adobe Encore CS6
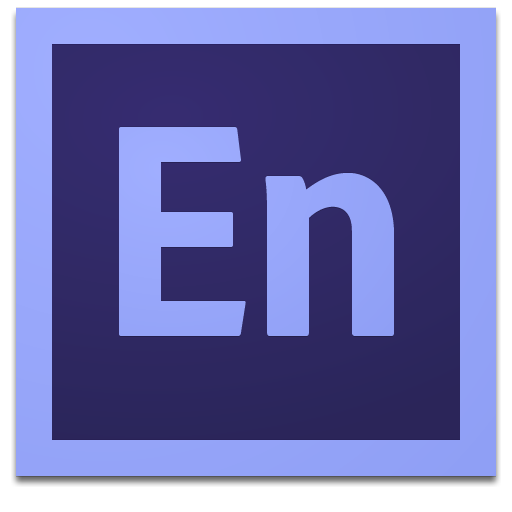

- Encore CS6 under Mac OS X 10.7 "Lion"
- Developer: Adobe Systems
- Initial release: 1.0 (September 2003)
- Final release: CS6 (6.0) / April 23, 2012
- Operating system: Windows and OS X
- Type: DVD authoring
- License: Trialware
- Website: www.adobe.com/products/encore.html

Adobe Encore (previously Adobe Encore DVD) was a DVD authoring software tool produced by Adobe Systems and targeted at professional video producers. Video and audio resources could be used in their current format for development, allowing the user to transcode them to MPEG-2 video and Dolby Digital audio upon project completion. DVD menus could be created and edited in Adobe Photoshop using special layering techniques. Adobe Encore did not support writing to a Blu-ray Disc using AVCHD 2.0.

Encore is bundled with Adobe Premiere Pro CS6. Adobe Encore CS6 was the last release. While Premiere Pro CC has moved to the Creative Cloud, Encore has now been discontinued.

== Licensing ==
All forms of Adobe Encore used a proprietary licensing system from its developer, Adobe Systems. Versions 1.0 and 1.5 required a separate license fee (rather than making 1.5 available as a free update). Version 3, also known as CS3, was sold only in bundle with Premiere CS3. Encore CS4, CS5, CS5.5 and CS6 were only sold in the Premiere Pro CS4, CS5, CS5.5 and CS6 bundles, respectively. Adobe CC subscribers no longer have access to Adobe Encore CS6. Adobe Encore is not included with Premiere Pro CC.

== Functionality ==
Adobe Encore allowed for creating interactive DVD menus from Photoshop documents, which could be tweaked from within Encore. Video and audio streams could be embedded in the DVD and be made to play when certain elements of the menu are interacted with. It had similar functionality to Adobe Flash and Premiere Pro, due to its ability to both edit video on a timeline and embed interactive content.

== See also ==
- Video editing software
- Adobe Creative Cloud
