= Adobe Aero =

Augmented reality authoring and publishing tool

- Developer: Adobe Inc.
- Release: November 4, 2019; 7 years ago
- Stable release: iOS version 2.15, Desktop version 0.15 / [Still in beta]
- Operating system: iOS, iPadOS, macOS, Windows
- Available in: English
- Type: Augmented reality
- License: Software as a service
- Website: adobe.com/aero

Adobe Aero is a discontinued augmented reality authoring and publishing tool by Adobe Inc. on Creative Cloud. Aero was available for iOS, although there were also versions for macOS and Windows, all of which are no longer available. Adobe Aero was originally announced as a private beta for iOS users at Adobe MAX 2018, seeing its official launch at Adobe MAX 2019.

Aero is part of Adobe's 3D and AR series, which also includes Dimension, Mixamo, and Substance by Adobe. It was discontinued in stages beginning November 6, 2025, and ending December 16, 2025 with the deletion of user data from Adobe's servers.
