= Adobe Prelude =

Ingest and logging software application

- Adobe Prelude
- Developer: Adobe Inc.
- Operating system: Windows 10 only v1803 and later, Mac OS 10.12 Sierra and later
- Type: Video monitoring and recording software
- License: Proprietary
- Website: www.adobe.com/products/prelude.html

Adobe Prelude was an ingest and logging software application for tagging media with metadata for searching, post-production workflows, and footage lifecycle management. Adobe Prelude is also made to work closely with Adobe Premiere Pro. It is part of the Adobe Creative Cloud and is geared towards professional video editing alone or with a group. The software also offers features like rough cut creation. A speech transcription feature was removed in December 2014.

== History ==
Adobe announced that on April 23, 2012 Adobe OnLocation would be shut down and Adobe Prelude would launch on May 7, 2012. Adobe stated OnLocation's production was stopping because of the growing trend in the industry toward tapeless, native workflows, Adobe stresses that Adobe Prelude is not a direct replacement for OnLocation. Adobe OnLocation was available in CS5 but not in CS6 and Adobe Prelude is only available in CS6. Adobe still offers technical support for OnLocation.

In 2021, Adobe announced they would be discontinuing Adobe Prelude, starting by removing it from their website on September 8, 2021. Support for existing users will continue through September 8, 2024.

== Features ==
Prelude is used to tag media, log data, create and export metadata and generate rough cuts that can be sent to Adobe Premiere Pro. A user can add a tag to a piece of media that will show up on Premiere Pro or if another user opens that media with Prelude.

Ingest Footage

Prelude can ingest all kinds of file types. Once ingested, Prelude can duplicate, transcode and verify the files.

Log Footage

Prelude can log data only using the keyboard.

Create Rough Cuts

Prelude is able to generate Rough Cuts. Rough Cuts are a combination of sub clips that will hold any metadata a user feeds into it. Rough cuts can hold metadata such as markers and comments, and this metadata will stay on this footage.

Workflow Accessibility

Prelude is an XMP - based open platform that allows for custom integration into many video editing platforms.

== Features from OnLocation ==
Many features from Adobe OnLocation went to Adobe Prelude or Adobe Premiere Pro. Adobe OnLocation thrived on tape - based cameras and setting up a shot before shooting it, with the change in the industry, this problem is irrelevant in post production. Adobe OnLocation also allowed the user to add tags and scripting metadata that would carry over to Premiere Pro. OnLocation also had a Media Browser pane, which is the standard for any Adobe program today, Prelude has this Media Browser as well.

== Prelude Live Logger ==
Prelude Live Logger is an application integrated with Prelude CC. Prelude Live Logger is designed to capture notes to use during video logging and editing while you shoot footage on an iPad's camera. Editors can import and combine this metadata with footage from Prelude throughout editing to facilitate various tasks.

== See also ==
- Creative Cloud controversy
