= FXG =

Flash XML Graphics (FXG) is a specification for an XML-based graphics file format for describing two-dimensional vector graphics developed by Adobe Systems. FXG was planned as a graphics interchange format for cross-application file support, to be used by Adobe Flash and Adobe Flash Player.

The XML model for FXG is based as closely as possible on the SVG XML graphics format.

Since HTML5 replaced the purpose of Adobe flash FXG is not used anymore.
