= Adobe Visual Communicator =

Video broadcasting software

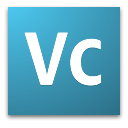

- Adobe Visual Communicator 3 running on Windows XP
- Developer: Adobe Systems
- Final release: 3.0 / September 25, 2007; 19 years ago
- Operating system: Microsoft Windows
- Type: Video editing software
- License: commercial proprietary software
- Website: www.adobe.com/products/visualcommunicator/

Adobe Visual Communicator is a Windows-based video-broadcasting software that enables teachers, lecturers and students to create presentation videos by using graphics, audio, and special effects and present in email, the Internet, a CD or DVD, or over a Closed-Circuit System. Unlike most other video editing software, Visual Communicator doesn't use a traditional timeline. Instead, Communicator uses an on-screen teleprompter that the person can read from a laptop or desktop while a webcam recorder records the video and audio of them talking.

The program was formerly a brand of Serious Magic when version 1.0 was released in 2003. Following the acquisition of the company in 2006, by Adobe, the name was changed in Adobe Visual Communicator, a year before Adobe released version 3.0 in 2007.

Visual Communicator received praise from magazines and online sources, giving credit for its features, mostly the teleprompter. Mark Montgomery of videomaker.com called it great for people "who want to quickly and easily create content." The software also inspired technology teacher Rob Zdrojewski to make a TV studio for his sixth, seventh and eighth graders for doing school newscasts, which are also uploaded onto SchoolTube. Adobe has deterred sales and development of the software since June 1, 2013, recommending Adobe Premiere Elements and Adobe Premiere Pro CC for making television-like newscasts.
