= Adobe Story =

Discontinued script development tool

- Developer: Adobe Systems
- Final release: 0.0.0 / N/A
- Operating system: Web browser, Windows, macOS
- Website: story.adobe.com

Adobe Story was a collaborative script development tool from Adobe Inc. It included scheduling tools, allowing schedules to be created from one or many scripts. Adobe Story was tightly integrated with Adobe Creative Cloud. It was available as a web-based application, a desktop application, and a mobile app. The desktop application could sync with the online version.

== History ==
Adobe Story was announced as a public beta at the IBC tradeshow in Amsterdam on September 10, 2009. A March 2012 update added shooting schedule comparison, conflict detection, and the ability to import text, Word and PDF documents as the current script version.

== Discontinuation ==
On January 23, 2018, Adobe announced that they would be discontinuing Adobe Story CC and Adobe Story CC Classic on January 22, 2019. Adobe recommended that customers migrate data and stated they would delete all the data after the discontinuation, which they have since done.
