= Adobe ImageReady =

Bitmap graphics editor

- Adobe ImageReady CS2 running on Windows XP. The "Edit in Photoshop" button discussed in the article is visible at the very bottom of the toolbox.
- Developer: Adobe Systems
- Release: July 1998; 28 years ago
- Final release: CS2 (9.0) / 2005; 21 years ago
- Operating system: Windows, Classic Mac OS and Mac OS X
- Type: Bitmap graphics editor
- License: Trialware
- Website: Adobe.com

Adobe ImageReady was a bitmap graphics editor that was shipped with Adobe Photoshop for six years. It was available for Windows, Classic Mac OS and Mac OS X from 1998 to 2007. ImageReady was designed for web development and closely interacted with Photoshop.

== Function ==
ImageReady was designed for web development rather than effects-intensive photo manipulation. To that end, ImageReady has specialized features such as animated GIF creation, image compression optimization, image slicing, adding rollover effects, and HTML generation.

Photoshop versions with which ImageReady was released have an "Edit in ImageReady" button that enables editing of image directly in ImageReady. ImageReady, in turn, has an "Edit in Photoshop" button.

ImageReady has strong resemblances to Photoshop; it can even use the same set of Photoshop filters. One set of tools that does not resemble the Photoshop tools, however, is the Image Map set of tools, indicated by a shape or arrow with a hand that varied depending upon the version. This toolbox has several features not found in Photoshop, including:

- Toggle Image Map Visibility and Toggle Slice Visibility tools: toggle between showing and hiding image maps and slices, respectively
- Export Animation Frames as Files option: saves all or specified frames for an alternate use, e.g., to e-mail slides for review
- Preview Document tool: provides a preview of rollover effects in ImageReady rather than previewing them in a browser
- Preview in Default Browser tool: previews the image in a browser, including any rollover or animation effects
- Edit in Photoshop button: opens the current image in Photoshop

== History ==
Adobe ImageReady 1.0 was released in July 1998 as a standalone application. Version 2.0 was packaged with Photoshop 5.5, and the program was included with Photoshop through version 9.0 (CS2). Starting with Photoshop 7.0, Adobe changed the version numbers of ImageReady to match.

ImageReady release summary
Version	Release date	Bundled with
v1	July 1998	—N/a
v2	July 1999	Photoshop 5.5
v3	October 2000	Photoshop 6.0
v7	February 2002	Photoshop 7.0
v8 ("CS")	October 2003	Photoshop CS
v9 ("CS2")	May 2005	Photoshop CS2

With the release of the Creative Suite 3, ImageReady was discontinued. According to Adobe, ImageReady's most popular features were merged into Photoshop. (Even before discontinuation, some of ImageReady's web optimization functionality could be found in Photoshop's Save For Web & Devices tool.) Around the same time, Adobe purchased rival software developer Macromedia, whose application Fireworks had been a competitor to ImageReady.
