= Adobe Creative Cloud =

Subscription-based offering from Adobe Inc.

- Developer: Adobe
- Release: July 17, 2013; 13 years ago
- Stable release: CC 2027 / November 10, 2026; 7 days ago
- Operating system: Windows, macOS, Android, and iOS
- Predecessor: Adobe Creative Suite 6
- Available in: English
- Type: Software suite
- License: Trialware, Proprietary, term
- Website: adobe.com/creativecloud

Adobe Creative Cloud is a set of applications and services from Adobe that gives subscribers access to a collection of software used for graphic design, video editing, web development, photography, along with a set of mobile applications and also some optional cloud services. In Creative Cloud (CC), a monthly or annual subscription service is delivered over the Internet. Software from Creative Cloud is downloaded from the Internet, installed directly on a local computer and used as long as the subscription remains valid. Online updates and multiple languages are included in the CC subscription. Creative Cloud was initially hosted on Amazon Web Services, but an agreement with Microsoft led to the software being hosted on Microsoft Azure beginning in 2017.

Adobe offered individual products as well as software suites containing several products (such as Adobe Creative Suite or Adobe eLearning Suite) with a perpetual software license.

Adobe first announced the Creative Cloud in October 2011. Another version of Adobe Creative Suite was released the following year. On May 6, 2013, Adobe announced that they would not release new versions of the Creative Suite and that future versions of its software would be available only through the Creative Cloud. The first new versions made only for the Creative Cloud were released on June 17, 2013.

== Current applications and services ==
The Adobe Creative Cloud retains many of the features of Adobe Creative Suite and introduces new features; foremost is the instant availability of upgrades, saving to the cloud, and easier sharing. In June 2014, the company announced 14 new versions of the Creative Cloud essential desktop tools, four new mobile apps, and the availability of creative hardware for enterprise, education and photography customers.

The video disc authoring program Adobe Encore and the web-focused bitmap editor Adobe Fireworks were both discontinued by Adobe in 2013, but were still available as downloads via Creative Cloud until May 2019.

=== Packages ===
Adobe offers four tiers of the Creative Cloud subscription service for individuals (there are other types for Business and Schools):

- Photograph, which contains some photography-related features of Adobe Creative Cloud and access to Photoshop CC and Lightroom CC.
- Single App, which contains all the features of Creative Cloud plus access to a single application of the user's choice in the suite out of a list of 11 selected applications.
- All Apps, the main tier of Creative Cloud that contains all the features of Creative Cloud plus access to all applications within the suite.
- All Apps + Adobe Stock, which contains all the standard features of Creative Cloud plus features for Adobe Stock.

=== Desktop, mobile, and web services ===
The following contains the services found on Creative Cloud.

| Icons | Product name | Latest major version | Available in | Supported OS |
|---|---|---|---|---|
| | Acrobat | 2026.003 | Standalone package Creative Suite; Creative Cloud; Technical Communication Suite | Windows, macOS, Android, iOS, web |
| | Aero (Discontinued 6 Nov 2025) | Beta (0.23.4) | Standalone product | Windows, macOS, Android, iOS |
| | After Effects | CC 2027 (27.0) | Standalone package Creative Suite; Creative Cloud | Windows, macOS |
| | Animate (formerly Flash Professional) | CC 2027 (27.0) | Standalone package Creative Suite eLearning Suite; Creative Cloud | Windows, macOS |
| | Audition | CC 2027 (27.0) | Standalone package Creative Suite eLearning Suite; Creative Cloud | Windows, macOS |
| | Behance | N/A | Standalone product Creative Cloud | Android, iOS, web |
| | Bridge | CC 2027 (17.0) | Creative Suite eLearning Suite; Photoshop; Creative Cloud | Windows, macOS |
| | Capture | 9.1.3 (iOS) | Standalone product Creative Cloud | iOS |
| | Character Animator | CC 2026 (26.0.0) | Standalone product Creative Cloud | Windows, macOS |
| | Color (formerly Kuler) | N/A | Standalone product Creative Cloud | Web (formerly iOS and Android) |
| | Comp | | Standalone product Creative Cloud | Android, iOS |
| | Creative Cloud Desktop app | 6.11.0 | Standalone product Creative Cloud | Windows, macOS, Android, iOS, web |
| | Dimension | CC 2025 (4.1.7) | Standalone product Creative Cloud | Windows, macOS |
| | Dreamweaver | CC 2025 (21.8.1) | Standalone package Creative Suite eLearning Suite; Creative Cloud | Windows, macOS |
| | Dynamic Link | N/A | Standalone package Creative Cloud; Creative Suite | Windows, macOS |
| | Express | N/A | Standalone package Creative Cloud | Web, Android, iOS |
| | ExtendScript Toolkit | CC | Standalone package Creative Cloud | |
| | Fonts (formerly Typekit) | N/A | Standalone package Creative Cloud | Web |
| | Fresco | 8.0 | Standalone package Creative Cloud | Windows, iOS |
| | Illustrator | CC 2027 (31.0) | Standalone package Creative Cloud; Creative Suite | Windows, macOS, iOS |
| | Illustrator Graphic Art | 3.0 | | Android, iOS |
| | InCopy | CC 2027 (22.0) | Standalone package Creative Cloud; Creative Suite | Windows, macOS |
| | InDesign | CC 2027 (22.0) | Standalone package Creative Cloud; Creative Suite | Windows, macOS |
| | Lightroom | CC 2027 (10.0) | Standalone package Creative Cloud; Creative Suite | Windows, macOS, Android, iOS, web |
| | Lightroom Classic | CC 2027 (16.0) | Standalone package Creative Cloud | Windows, macOS |
| | Media Encoder | CC 2027 (27.0) | Creative Cloud; Creative Suite | Windows, macOS |
| | Photoshop | CC 2027 (28.0) | Standalone package Creative Suite; Creative Cloud eLearning Suite | Windows, macOS, web |
| | Photoshop Camera | | Standalone package Creative Cloud | Android, iOS |
| | Photoshop Fix | 1.3 | Standalone package Creative Cloud | Android, iOS |
| | Photoshop Mix | | Standalone package Creative Cloud | Android, iOS |
| | Photoshop Sketch | 3.4 | Standalone package Creative Cloud | Android, iOS |
| | Portfolio | N/A | Standalone package Creative Cloud | Web |
| | Premiere | CC 2027 (27.0) | Creative Suite; Creative Cloud | Windows, macOS |
| | Premiere Video Editor | CC 2027 (26.23) | Standalone; Creative Cloud | Android, iOS |
| | Stock | N/A | Standalone; Creative Cloud | Web |
| | XD (In Maintenance Mode, pending discontinuation) | CC 2026 (61.0.12) | Standalone; Creative Cloud | Windows, macOS |

=== Hidden helper tools ===
- Adobe IPC Broker is an app bundled with Creative Cloud running in the background. This hidden program runs a process that integrates multiple Creative Cloud apps such as Photoshop or Illustrator.

== Discontinued products ==
- Flash Builder, formerly Flex Builder, was an integrated development environment (IDE) built on the Eclipse platform meant for developing rich Internet applications (RIAs) and cross-platform desktop applications for the Adobe Flash platform.
- Flash Professional (now Adobe Animate) is Flash's content authoring application.
- Fuse, formerly Fuse Character Creator, is a 3D character animation application originally developed by Mixamo. It was acquired by Adobe Systems in June 2015 and was discontinued while in beta testing.
- Ideas CC is a mobile digital sketchpad app that lets you design almost anywhere using vectors, layers, and color themes.
- Kuler CC, later called Adobe Color CC, was a color theming app for mobile devices. It was developed and marketed by Adobe Inc. through Adobe Creative Cloud.
- Muse is a discontinued offline website builder used to create fixed, fluid, or adaptive websites, without the need to write code.
- Prelude was a logging software application for tagging media files???
- Premiere Clip is a timeline based video editing software on mobile platform.
- Premiere Rush was a cross-platform simple video editing app discontinued in Sept 2025 and replaced by Premiere AI Video Editor app on iOS and Android.
- Preview CC is an app for previewing mobile designs.
- Scout is a profiling tool for Flash SWF files.
- Spark Page and Spark Video were discontinued in March 2025 and replaced with the Adobe Express App.
- SpeedGrade was a tool for performing color corrections and developing looks for Premiere projects. SpeedGrade was discontinued on August 22, 2017, but could still be used by subscribers at the time. Features from SpeedGrade are now found in the Lumetri Color Correction feature in Premiere.
- Story was a screenwriting and film/TV pre-production online application which integrates with the Premiere family. It allows users to create movie scripts for their movies.
- Voco is an unreleased audio editing and generating prototype software by Adobe that enables novel editing and generation of audio.

== Reception ==
The change from perpetual licenses to a subscription model was met with significant criticism. Although Adobe's cloud-based model caused disagreement and uncertainty, and incited annoyance and conflict, a survey by CNET and Jefferies in 2013 revealed that, despite complaints, most of its 1.4 million subscribers planned to renew.

=== Subscription-based licensing in the cloud ===
Shifting to a subscription-based licensing model using cloud computing, Adobe announced more frequent feature updates to its products and the eschewing of their traditional release cycles. Customers must pay a monthly subscription fee. Consequently, if subscribers cancel or stop paying, they will lose access to all or some of the software as well as the ability to open work saved in its proprietary file formats. Creative Cloud has been described as an example of enshittification.

Although investors applauded the move, many customers reacted negatively. This shift has been met with mixed reviews by both corporations and independent designers, with many people expressing their displeasure on the web and through multiple Internet petitions. Among these was a Change.org petition which reached over 30,000 signatures within a few weeks of the announcement.

Creative Cloud has been criticized for broken file syncing, one of its core features. In May 2013 Adobe announced that it was suspending the file-sync desktop preview "for the next couple of weeks". Reviewers of Creative Cloud were disappointed with the functionality of the cloud storage and were "far from convinced by Adobe's subscription model". Some users were concerned that they would be forced to upgrade their computer hardware when it is no longer supported by the current version of the Creative Cloud software.

Some of their customers experienced a loss of trust in Adobe as a company and an attendant rise in anxiety. Despite significant customer criticism over Adobe's move to subscription-only pricing, the company announced that it would not sell perpetual licenses to its software alongside the subscriptions: "We understand this is a big change, but we are so focused on the vision we shared for Creative Cloud, and we plan to focus all our new innovation on the Creative Cloud".

In May 2014 the service was interrupted for over a day due to a login outage leaving graphics professionals locked out of Creative Cloud. Adobe apologized for this global Creative Cloud failure. When initially asked whether customers would be compensated, the company's Customer Service responded: "We cannot offer compensation for the outage. I'm so sorry again for the frustration." Adobe later announced that it would review compensation on "a case by case basis". The outage was heavily criticized, as was Adobe's subscription-based licensing model in general.

Online articles began offering examples of replacements for Adobe products, with competing products directly offering alternatives, and launching promotions for dissatisfied Adobe customers. Adobe, however, claimed that Creative Cloud is its "highest customer satisfaction product in the creative space" and that even prior to Adobe's move to a pure subscription model, "more than 80 percent of customers who bought products from Adobe's Web site picked CC over CS."

Although Creative Cloud was expected to curtail the piracy of Photoshop, which is one of the most pirated pieces of software, Creative Cloud was hacked and its applications were made available via unauthorized means a day after it officially launched. Adobe claimed that the subscription payment plan would make its software more accessible to users who previously pirated it.

On May 14, 2019, some Creative Cloud users received emails from Adobe stating that licenses to previous versions of Creative Cloud applications had been terminated and that users could face civil action from third parties if they did not update the software on their personal computers. A representative from Adobe confirmed the letter's authenticity. The situation prompted renewed criticism of Adobe's subscription-only business model.

In February 2024, Adobe updated parts 2.2 and 4.1 of their General Terms of Use to mention that they would be regularly checking content uploaded by users of their software to Creative Cloud; this decision was met with heavy backlash by professionals after a viral Twitter post that June bought it to public attention, with fears that the clause would lead to their work being used to train generative AI or give Adobe access to projects bound by a non-disclosure agreement. That same month, Adobe released a blog post clarifying that this measure was put into place to stop their apps and services from being used to create and/or process illegal material, and that they had not and would not train AI on consumer-made content.

== See also ==
- List of Adobe software
