= Adobe Photoshop =

Raster graphics editing software

- Photoshop 2025 running on Windows 10
- Original authors: Thomas Knoll; John Knoll
- Developer: Adobe
- Release: February 19, 1990; 36 years ago
- Stable release: 28.0 / November 10, 2026; 5 days ago
- Written in: C++
- Operating system: Windows 10 21H2 LTSC and later macOS 13 and later iPadOS 17 and later iOS 17 and later Android 11 and later
- Platform: x86-64, ARM64
- Available in: 26 languages
- List of languages American English, British English, Arabic, Mandarin Chinese, Chinese Traditional, Czech, Danish, Dutch, Finnish, French, German, Hebrew, Hungarian, Italian, Japanese, Korean, Norwegian, Polish, Portuguese, Russian, Spanish, Swedish, Romanian, Turkish and Ukrainian
- Type: Raster graphics editor
- License: Trialware, Proprietary, term
- Website: photoshop.com

Adobe Photoshop is a proprietary raster graphics editor developed and published by Adobe for Windows and macOS. It was created in 1987 by Thomas and John Knoll. It is the most used tool for professional digital art, especially in raster graphics editing, and its name has become genericised as a verb (e.g., to "photoshop" an image, "photoshopping", and "photoshop contest") although Adobe disapproves of such use.

Photoshop can edit and compose raster images in multiple layers and supports masks, alpha compositing and several color models. Photoshop uses its own PSD and PSB file formats to support these features. In addition to raster graphics, Photoshop has limited abilities to edit or render text and vector graphics (especially through clipping path for the latter), as well as 3D graphics and video. Its feature set can be expanded by plug-ins; programs developed and distributed independently of Photoshop that run inside it and offer new or enhanced features.

Photoshop's naming scheme was initially based on version numbers. However, in October 2002 (following the introduction of Creative Suite branding), each new version of Photoshop was designated with "CS" plus a number; e.g., the eighth major version of Photoshop was Photoshop CS and the ninth was Photoshop CS2. Photoshop CS3 through CS6 were also distributed in two different editions: Standard and Extended. With the introduction of the Creative Cloud branding in June 2013 (and, in turn, the change of the "CS" suffix to "CC"), Photoshop's licensing scheme was changed to that of subscription model. Historically, Photoshop was bundled with additional software such as Adobe ImageReady, Adobe Fireworks, Adobe Bridge, Adobe Device Central and Adobe Camera RAW.

Alongside Photoshop, Adobe also develops and publishes Photoshop Elements, Photoshop Lightroom, Photoshop Express, Photoshop Fix, Adobe Illustrator, and Photoshop Mix. As of November 2019, Adobe has also released a full version of Photoshop for the iPad, and while initially limited, Adobe plans to bring more features to Photoshop for iPad. Collectively, they are branded as "The Adobe Photoshop Family".

== Early history ==
Photoshop was developed in 1987 by two brothers, Thomas and John Knoll, who sold the distribution license to Adobe Systems Incorporated in 1988. Thomas Knoll, a Ph.D. student at the University of Michigan, began writing a program on his Macintosh Plus to display grayscale images on a monochrome display. This program (at that time called Display) caught the attention of his brother John, an Industrial Light & Magic employee, who recommended that Thomas turn it into a full-fledged image editing program. Thomas took a six-month break from his studies in 1988 to collaborate with his brother on the program. Thomas renamed the program ImagePro, but the name was already taken. Later that year, Thomas renamed his program Photoshop and worked out a short-term deal with scanner manufacturer Barneyscan to distribute copies of the program with a slide scanner; a "total of about 200 copies of Photoshop were shipped" this way.

During this time, John traveled to Silicon Valley and gave a demonstration of the program to engineers at Apple Computer and Russell Brown, art director at Adobe. Both showings were successful, and Adobe decided to purchase the license to distribute in September 1988. While John worked on plug-ins in California, Thomas remained in Ann Arbor writing code. Photoshop 1.0 was released on February 19, 1990, for Macintosh exclusively. The Barneyscan version included advanced color editing features that were stripped from the first Adobe shipped version. The handling of color slowly improved with each release from Adobe and Photoshop quickly became the industry standard in digital color editing. When Photoshop 1.0 was released, digital retouching on dedicated high-end systems (such as the Scitex) cost around $300 an hour for basic photo retouching. The list price of Photoshop 1.0 for Macintosh in 1990 was $895.

Photoshop was initially only available on Macintosh. In 1993, Adobe chief architect Seetharaman Narayanan ported Photoshop to Microsoft Windows. The Windows port led to Photoshop reaching a wider mass market audience as Microsoft's global reach expanded within the next few years. On March 31, 1995, Adobe purchased the rights for Photoshop from Thomas and John Knoll for $34.5 million so Adobe would no longer need to pay a royalty for each copy sold.

== File format ==
Photoshop document
- Filename extension: .psd
- Internet media type: image/vnd.adobe.photoshop
- Type code: 8BPS
- Uniform Type Identifier (UTI): com.adobe.photoshop-image
- Developed by: Adobe Inc.
- Initial release: February 19, 1990
- Open format?: no
- Website: www.adobe.com/devnet-apps/photoshop/fileformatashtml/

Photoshop files have default file extension as .PSD, which stands for "Photoshop Document". A PSD file stores an image with support for all features of Photoshop; these include layers with masks, transparency, text, alpha channels and spot colors, clipping paths, and duotone settings. This is in contrast to many other file formats (e.g., .JPG or .GIF) that restrict content to provide streamlined, predictable functionality. A PSD file has a maximum height and width of 30,000 pixels, and a size limit of two gigabytes.

From the beginning, Photoshop could save files in other formats, including TIF, JPEG, and GIF. These files are smaller than PSD files because they lack the editable features of a PSD file. These formats are required to use the file in publications or on the web. Adobe's discontinued program PageMaker required TIF format.

Photoshop can also create and use files with the extension .PSB, which stands for "Photoshop Big" (also known as "large document format"). A PSB file extends the PSD file format, increasing the maximum height and width to 300,000 pixels and the size limit to around 4 exabytes. PSD and PSB formats are documented.

Because of Photoshop's popularity, PSD files are widely used and supported to some extent by most competing software, including GIMP, Affinity Photo, and Clip Studio Paint. The .PSD file format can be exported to and from Adobe's other apps, such as Adobe Illustrator, Adobe Premiere Pro, and After Effects.

== Plugins ==
Photoshop functionality can be extended by add-on programs called Photoshop plugins (or plug-ins). Adobe creates some, such as Adobe Camera Raw, but most are developed by third-parties. Some are free and some are commercial software. Most plugins work with only Photoshop or Photoshop-compatible hosts, but a few can also be run as standalone applications.

There are various types of plugins, such as filter, export, import, selection, color correction, and automation. The most popular plugins are the filter plugins (also known as a 8bf plugins), available under the Filter menu in Photoshop. Filter plugins can either modify the current image or create content. Below are some popular types of plugins, and some well-known companies associated with them:

- Color correction plugins (Alien Skin Software, Nik Software, OnOne Software, Topaz Labs Software, The Plugin Site, etc.)
- Special effects plugins (Alien Skin Software, Auto FX Software, AV Bros., Flaming Pear Software, etc.)
- 3D effects plugins (Andromeda Software, Strata, etc.)

=== Camera Raw ===
Adobe Camera Raw (also known as ACR and Camera Raw) is a special plugin, supplied free by Adobe, used primarily to read and process raw image files so that the resulting images can be processed by Photoshop. It can also be used from within Adobe Bridge.

== Cultural impact ==
Photoshop and derivatives such as Photoshopped (or just Shopped) have become verbs that are sometimes used to refer to images edited by Photoshop, or any image manipulation program. The same happens not only in English but as the Portuguese Wikipedia entry for image manipulation attests, even in that language, with the trademark being followed by the Portuguese verb termination -ar, yielding the word "photoshopar" (to photoshop). Such derivatives are discouraged by Adobe because, in order to maintain validity and protect the trademark from becoming generic, trademarks must be used as proper nouns.

== Version history ==
Photoshop's naming scheme was initially based on version numbers, from early pre-release builds and version 1.0 (February 1990) through version 7.0.1. Adobe published seven major versions before the October 2003 introduction of version 8.0, which brought the Creative Suite branding.

Notable milestone features included filters, colour separation, virtual memory (1.0), paths, CMYK color (2.0), 16-bits-per-channel support, availability on Microsoft Windows (2.5), layers, tabbed palettes (3.0), adjustments, actions, freeform transform, PNG support (4.0), editable type, magnetic lasso and pen, freeform pen, multiple undo, layer effects (5.0), Save for Web (5.5), vector shapes, revised user interface (6.0), vector text, healing brush, spell check (7.0), and Camera Raw (7.0.1).

=== Pre-release versions ===
Version 0.87 (March 1989) was the first publicly available version of Photoshop, distributed commercially under the name "Barneyscan XP".

=== Version 1 ===
Photoshop 1.0 was released in February 1990.

=== Version 2 ===
Photoshop 2.0 was released in June 1991. It added support for paths and the CMYK color model.

Photoshop 2.5, released in November 1992, was the first version available for Windows.

=== Version 3 ===
Photoshop 3.0 was released in September 1994 for Mac OS 7. The Windows version came out later in November. Notably, this was the first version that brought Layers.

=== Version 4 ===
Photoshop 4.0 was released in November 1996.

=== Version 5 ===
Photoshop 5.0 was released in May 1998.

=== Version 6 ===
Photoshop 6.0 was released in September 2000.

=== Version 7 ===
Photoshop 7.0 was released in March 2002.

=== CS (version 8) ===
The first Photoshop CS was commercially released in October 2003 as the eighth major version of Photoshop. Photoshop CS increased user control with a reworked file browser augmenting search versatility, sorting and sharing capabilities and the Histogram Palette which monitors changes in the image as they are made to the document. Match Color was also introduced in CS, which reads color data to achieve a uniform expression throughout a series of pictures.

=== CS2 (version 9) ===
Photoshop CS2, released in May 2005, expanded on its predecessor with a new set of tools and features. It included an upgraded spot healing brush, which is mainly used for handling common photographic problems such as blemishes, red-eye, noise, blurring and lens distortion. One of the most significant inclusions in CS2 was the implementation of smart objects, which allows users to scale and transform images and vector illustrations without losing image quality, as well as create linked duplicates of embedded graphics so that a single edit updates across multiple iterations.

Adobe responded to feedback from the professional media industry by implementing non-destructive editing as well as the producing and modifying of 32-bit high dynamic range (HDR) images, which are optimal for 3D rendering and advanced compositing. FireWire previews could also be viewed on a monitor via a direct export feature.

Photoshop CS2 brought the vanishing point and image warping tools. Vanishing point tool makes tedious graphic and photo retouching endeavors much simpler by letting users clone, paint and transform image objects while maintaining visual perspective. Image warping tool makes it easy to digitally distort an image into a shape by choosing on-demand presets or by dragging control points.

The file browser was upgraded to Adobe Bridge, which functioned as a hub for productivity, imagery and creativity, providing multi-view file browsing and smooth cross-product integration across Adobe Creative Suite 2 software. Adobe Bridge also provided access to Adobe Stock Photos, a new stock photography service that offered users one-stop shopping across five elite stock image providers to deliver high-quality, royalty-free images for layout and design.

Camera raw version 3.0 was a new addition in CS2, and it allowed settings for multiple raw files to be modified simultaneously. In addition, processing multiple raw files to other formats including JPEG, TIFF, DNG or PSD, could be done in the background without executing Photoshop itself.

Photoshop CS2 brought a streamlined interface, making it easier to access features for specific instances. In CS2 users were also given the ability to create their own custom presets, which was meant to save time and increase productivity.

=== CS3 (version 10) ===
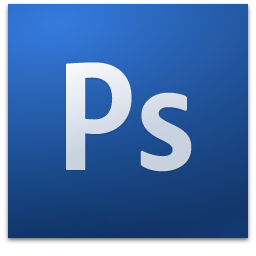
Adobe Photoshop CS3 icon

Smart Objects display filters without altering the original image (here on Mac OS X).

CS3 and CS3 Extended were released in April 2007 to the United States and Canada. They were also made available through Adobe's online store and Adobe Authorized Resellers. Both CS3 and CS3 Extended are offered as either a stand-alone application or feature of Adobe Creative Suite. Both products are compatible with Intel-based Macs and PowerPCs, supporting Windows XP and Windows Vista. CS3 is the first release of Photoshop that will run natively on Macs with Intel processors: previous versions can only run through the translation layer Rosetta, and will not run at all on Macs running Mac OS X 10.7 or later.

CS3 improves on features from previous versions of Photoshop and introduces new tools. One of the most significant is the streamlined interface which allows increased performance, speed, and efficiency. There is also improved support for Camera RAW files which allow users to process images with higher speed and conversion quality. CS3 supports over 150 RAW formats as well as JPEG, TIFF and PDF. Enhancements were made to the Black and White Conversion, Brightness and Contrast Adjustment and Vanishing Point Module tools. The Black and White adjustment option improves control over manual grayscale conversions with a dialog box similar to that of Channel Mixer. There is more control over print options and better management with Adobe Bridge. The Clone Source palette is introduced, adding more options to the clone stamp tool. Other features include the nondestructive Smart Filters, optimizing graphics for mobile devices, Fill Light and Dust Busting tools. Compositing is assisted with Photoshop's new Quick Selection and Refine Edge tools and improved image stitching technology.

CS3 Extended includes everything in CS3 and additional features. There are tools for 3D graphic file formats, video enhancement and animation, and comprehensive image measurement and analysis tools with DICOM file support. The 3D graphic formats allow 3D content to be incorporated into 2D compositions. As for video editing, CS3 supports layers and video formatting so users can edit video files per frame.

=== CS4 (version 11) ===
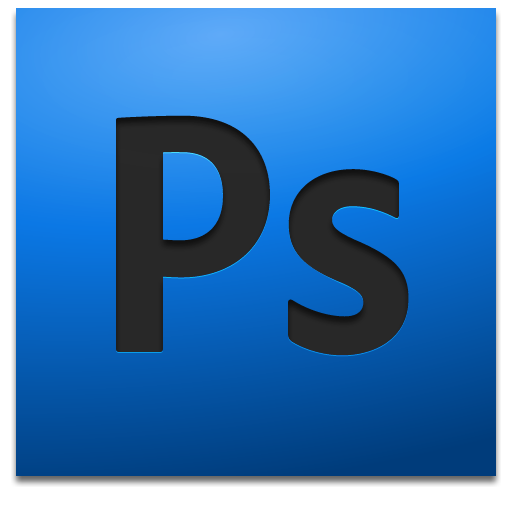
Adobe Photoshop CS4 icon

CS4 and CS4 Extended were released on October 15, 2008. They were also made available through Adobe's online store and Adobe Authorized Resellers. Both CS4 and CS4 Extended are offered as either a stand-alone application or feature of Adobe Creative Suite. Both products are compatible with Intel-based Mac OS X and PowerPCs, supporting Windows XP and Windows Vista.

CS4 features smoother panning and zooming, allowing faster image editing at a high magnification. The interface is more simplified with its tab-based interface making it cleaner to work with. Photoshop CS4 features a new 3D engine allowing the conversion of gradient maps to 3D objects, adding depth to layers and text, and getting print-quality output with the new ray-tracing rendering engine. It supports common 3D formats; the new Adjustment and Mask panels; content-aware scaling (seam carving); fluid canvas rotation and File display options. The content-aware scaling allows users to intelligently size and scale images, and the canvas rotation tool makes it easier to rotate and edit images from any angle.

Adobe released Photoshop CS4 Extended, which has the features of Adobe Photoshop CS4, plus capabilities for scientific imaging, 3D, motion graphics, accurate image analysis and high-end film and video users. The faster 3D engine allows users to paint directly on 3D models, wrap 2D images around 3D shapes and animate 3D objects. As the successor to Photoshop CS3, Photoshop CS4 is the first x64 edition of Photoshop on consumer computers for Windows. The color correction tool has also been improved significantly.

=== CS5 (version 12) ===
Adobe Photoshop CS5 icon

Photoshop CS5 was launched on April 12, 2010. In a video posted on its official Facebook page, the development team revealed the new technologies under development, including three-dimensional brushes and warping tools.

In May 2011, Adobe Creative Suite 5.5 (CS5.5) was released, with new versions of some of the applications. Its version of Photoshop, 12.1, is identical to the concurrently released update for Photoshop CS5, version 12.0.4, except for support for the new subscription pricing that was introduced with CS5.5.

CS5 introduces new tools such as the Content-Aware Fill, Refine Edge, Mixer Brush, Bristle Tips and Puppet Warp. The community also had a hand in the additions made to CS5 as 30 new features and improvements were included by request. These include automatic image straightening, the Rule-of-Thirds cropping tool, color pickup, and saving a 16-bit image as a JPEG. Another feature includes the Adobe Mini Bridge, which allows for efficient file browsing and management.

CS5 Extended includes everything in CS5 plus features in 3D and video editing. A new materials library was added, providing more options such as Chrome, Glass, and Cork. The new Shadow Catcher tool can be used to further enhance 3D objects. For motion graphics, the tools can be applied to over more than one frame in a video sequence.

CS5 and CS5 Extended were made available through Adobe's online store, Adobe Authorized Resellers and Adobe direct sales. Both CS5 and CS5 Extended are offered as either a stand-alone application or a feature of Adobe Creative Suite 5. Both products are compatible with Intel-based Mac OS X and Windows XP, Windows Vista, and Windows 7.

=== CS6 (version 13) ===
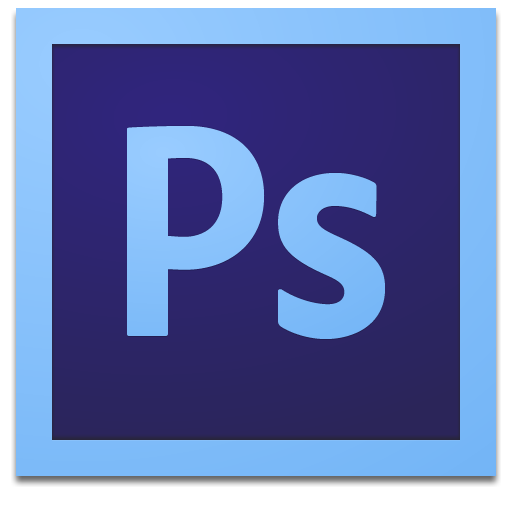
Adobe Photoshop CS6 icon

Photoshop CS6, released in May 2012, added new creative design tools and provided a redesigned interface with a focus on enhanced performance. New features have been added to the Content-Aware tool such as the Content-Aware Patch and Content-Aware Move.

Adobe Photoshop CS6 brought a suite of tools for video editing. Color and exposure adjustments, as well as layers, are among a few things that are featured in this new editor. Upon completion of editing, the user is presented with a handful of options of exporting into a few popular formats.

CS6 brings the "straighten" tool to Photoshop, where a user simply draws a line anywhere on an image, and the canvas will reorient itself so that the line drawn becomes horizontal, and adjusts the media accordingly. This was created with the intention that users will draw a line parallel to a plane in the image, and reorient the image to that plane to more easily achieve certain perspectives.

CS6 allows background saving, which means that while another document is compiling and archiving itself, it is possible to simultaneously edit an image. CS6 also features a customizable auto-save feature, preventing any work from being lost.

With version 13.1.3, Adobe dropped support for Windows XP (including Windows XP Professional x64 Edition); thus, the last version that works on Windows XP is 13.0.1. Adobe also announced that CS6 will be the last suite sold with perpetual licenses in favor of the new Creative Cloud subscriptions, though they will continue to provide OS compatibility support as well as bug fixes and security updates as necessary.

Starting January 9, 2017, CS6 is no longer available for purchase, making a Creative Cloud license the only purchase option going forward. No more updates will be available for all CS6 software either.

=== CC (version 14) ===
Adobe Photoshop CC icon

Photoshop CC (14.0) was launched on June 18, 2013. As the next major version after CS6, it is only available as part of a Creative Cloud subscription. Major features in this version include new Smart Sharpen, Intelligent Upsampling, and Camera Shake Reduction for reducing blur caused by camera shake. Editable Rounded Rectangles and an update to Adobe Camera Raw (8.0) were also included.

Since the initial launch, Adobe has released two additional feature-bearing updates. The first, version 14.1, was launched on September 9, 2013. The major features in this version were Adobe Generator, a Node.js-based platform for creating plug-ins for Photoshop. Photoshop 14.1 shipped with two plug-ins, one to automatically generate image assets based on an extension in the layer name, and another to automatically generate assets for Adobe Edge Reflow.

Version 14.2 was released on January 15, 2014. Major features include Perspective Warp, Linked Smart Objects, and 3D Printing support.

=== CC 2014 (version 15) ===
Photoshop CC 2014 (15.0) was released on June 18, 2014. CC 2014 features improvements to content-aware tools, two new blur tools (spin blur and path blur) and a new focus mask feature that enables the user to select parts of an image based on whether they are in focus or not. Other minor improvements have been made, including speed increases for certain tasks.

=== CC 2015 (version 16 and version 17) ===
Photoshop CC 2015 was released on June 15, 2015. Adobe added various creative features including Adobe Stock, which is a library of custom stock images. It also includes and have the ability to have more than one layer style. For example, in the older versions of Photoshop, only one shadow could be used for a layer but in CC 2015, up to ten are available. Other minor features like Export As, which is a form of the Save For Web in CC 2014 were also added. The updated UI as of November 30, 2015, delivers a cleaner and more consistent look throughout Photoshop, and the user can quickly perform common tasks using a new set of gestures on touch-enabled devices like Microsoft Surface Pro. CC 2015 also marks the 25th anniversary of Photoshop.

=== CC 2017 (version 18) ===
Photoshop CC 2017 was released on November 2, 2016. It introduced a new template selector when creating new documents, the ability to search for tools, panels and help articles for Photoshop, support for SVG OpenType fonts and other small improvements. In December 2016, a minor update was released to include support for the MacBook Pro Touch Bar.

=== CC 2018 (version 19) ===
Photoshop CC 2018 (version 19) was released on October 18, 2017. It featured an overhaul to the brush organization system, allowing for more properties (such as color and opacity) to be saved per-brush and for brushes to be categorized in folders and sub-folders. It also added brush stroke smoothing, and over 1000 brushes created by Kyle T. Webster (following Adobe's acquisition of his website, KyleBrush.com). A Curvature Pen tool, similar to the one in Illustrator, was added, allowing for faster creation of Bézier paths. Other additions were Lightroom Photo access, Variable font support, select subject, copy-paste layers, enhanced tooltips, 360 panorama and HEIF support, PNG compression, increased maximum zoom level, symmetry mode, algorithm improvements to Face-aware and selection tools, color and luminance range masking, improved image resizing, and performance improvements to file opening, filters, and brush strokes.

=== CC 2019 (version 20) ===
Photoshop CC 2019 was released on October 15, 2018. Beginning with Photoshop CC 2019 (version 20.0), the 32-bit version of Windows is no longer supported. This version Introduced a new tool called Frame Tool to create placeholder frames for images. It also added multiple undo mode, auto-commitment, and prevented accidental panel moves with lock work-space. Live blend mode previews are added, allowing for faster scrolling over different blend mode options in the layers panel. Other additions were Color Wheel, Transform proportionally without Shift key, Distribute spacing like in Illustrator, ability to see longer layer names, match font with Japanese fonts, flip document view, scale UI to font, reference point hidden by default, new compositing engine, which provides a more modern compositing architecture is added which is easier to optimize on all platforms.

=== Photoshop for iPad 2019 ===
Adobe Photoshop iPad 2019

Adobe announced Photoshop for iPad in October 2018, and it was released in November 2019 alongside Photoshop 2020 (version 21) for desktop. It was designed to bring the core Photoshop experience to iPad, with support for PSD files and cloud documents that allowed users to work across iPad, Windows, and macOS. The iPad version included features such as layers, selections, masking, and retouching tools, but it did not initially include all of the features available in the desktop version. Adobe stated that it planned to add more desktop Photoshop features to the iPad version over time. The release marked Photoshop’s first major version designed specifically for iPad.

=== 2020 (version 21) ===
Adobe Photoshop CC icon

Photoshop 2020 was released on November 4, 2019. Version 21 has many new and enhanced features like the new object selection tool for better automation of complex selections, new properties panel, enhanced transform warp, new keyboard shortcuts for paint & brush and background image removal option. It added several improvements to the new content-aware fill and to the new document tab. Also added were animated GIF support, improved lens blur performance and one-click zoom to a layer's contents. It introduced new swatches, gradients, patterns, shapes and stylistic sets for OpenType fonts. With this version users now can easily convert smart objects to layers and also can adjust 32-bit layers for brightness/contrast and curves. Presets are now more intuitive to use and easier to organize.

With the February 2020 update (version 21.1) Photoshop now can iteratively fill multiple areas of an image without having to leave content-aware fill workspace. This version improved GPU based lens blur quality and provided performance improvements, such as accelerating workflows with smoother panning, zooming and navigation of documents.

Version 21 was the first version where the iPad version was released. With Photoshop on the iPad, combined with the new Cloud PSD file format, a user can save cloud documents and work across Windows, Mac and iPad. Photoshop on the iPad does not have all the features of the desktop Photoshop. Adobe promises to update Photoshop on the iPad at "a much more aggressive pace than it has with its current Creative Cloud apps for the desktop". Adobe has provided a timeline for enhancing Photoshop on the iPad to have more of the features of desktop Photoshop.

Version 21.2 of the desktop version was released in June 2020. It introduced faster portrait selection, Adobe Camera Raw improvements, auto-activated Adobe Fonts, rotatable patterns, and improved Match Font.

=== 2021 (version 22) ===
Version 22.0.0 was released in October 2020.

Version 22.0.1 was released in November 2020.

Version 22.1.0 was released in December 2020.

Version 22.1.1 was released in January 2021.

Version 22.2 was released in February 2021.

Version 22.3 was released in March 2021. This is the first macOS release to run natively on Apple silicon.

Version 22.3.1 was released in April 2021.

Version 22.4 was released in May 2021.

Version 22.4.1 was released in May 2021.

Version 22.4.2 was released in June 2021.

Version 22.4.3 was released in July 2021.

Version 22.5 was released in August 2021.

Version 22.5.1 was released in September 2021. Final version to include (as Legacy Swatches) a large set of Pantone color books, including Pastels & Neons, and Premium Metallics.

=== 2022 (version 23) ===
Version 23.0 was released in October 2021. First version to include (as Legacy Swatches) a reduced set of Pantone color books - only CMYK, Metallics and Solid colors.

Content Credentials (Beta) was introduced. When enabled, the editing information is captured in a tamper-evident form and resides with the file through successive copy generations. It aligns with the C2PA standard on digital provenance across the internet.

Version 23.0.1 was released in November 2021.

Version 23.0.2 was released in November 2021.

Version 23.1 was released in December 2021.

Version 23.1.1 was released in January 2022.

Version 23.2 was released in February 2022.

Version 23.3 was released in April 2022.

Version 23.4 was released in June 2022.

Version 23.5 was released in August 2022. Final version with built-in support for basic Pantone colors - CMYK, Metallics and Solid (as Legacy Swatches). Future versions require a separate subscription to access Pantone colors.

=== 2023 (version 24) ===
Version 24.0 was released in October 2022. First version without built-in support for Pantone colors. All Pantone colors have been removed as of August 16, 2022. Separate paid subscription now required to access Pantone Connect extension and download color "fandecks".

Version 24.1 was released in December 2022.

Version 24.4.1 was released on April 20, 2023.

Version 24.7 was released on July 27, 2023.

=== 2024 (version 25) ===
Version 25.0 was released in September 2023. This version added Generative Fill and Generative Expand for commercial use. This was the last version where the CPU requirements on the Intel platform were limited to only SSE 4.2 instructions, which meant the x86-64-v2 microarchitecture (Intel Nehalem and newer, AMD Bulldozer and newer).

=== 2025 (version 26) ===
Version 26 was released in October 2024. The CPU requirements on the Intel platform have been increased to support AVX2 instructions, which means the x86-64-v3 microarchitecture (Intel Haswell and newer, AMD Excavator and newer).

== Adobe Photoshop family ==
The Adobe Photoshop family is a group of applications and services made by Adobe for the use of professional image editing. Several features of the Adobe Photoshop family are pixel manipulating, image organizing, photo retouching, and more.

=== Current applications ===
- Bridge is an image organizer and digital asset management app. It features limited integration with other Adobe apps but has no editing capabilities of its own.
- DNG Converter is a stand-alone (and free) tool used to convert proprietary raw files into DNG files. It can also be used to change a DNG file's settings, e. g. to convert an uncompressed DNG file into a compressed one.
- Elements Organizer is the digital asset management app for Photoshop Elements and Premiere Elements. It is able to organize photos and video projects in one place.
- Fresco is a mobile drawing and painting app, developed initially for iOS and marketed by Adobe through Creative Cloud. It was later adapted to run on certain Windows devices and Microsoft Surface tablets.
- Photoshop Lightroom is a creative image organization and image manipulation software developed by Adobe Inc. as part of the Creative Cloud subscription family.
- Lightroom Classic is the offline desktop version of the Photoshop Lightroom photo editing and viewing applications offered by subscription through Creative Cloud.
- Photoshop Camera is an image tool that easily captures and shares photos with your camera.
- Photoshop Elements is a graphics editor for photographers, image editors and hobbyists. It contains most of the features of the professional version but with fewer and simpler options. The program allows users to create, edit, organize and share images. Originally introduced alongside Adobe Photoshop version 6, Photoshop Elements targets photography enthusiasts and thus lacks many features that make it useful in a proper print production environment. Photoshop Elements is available for Windows and macOS. It is not available as part of a Creative Cloud subscription, but rather as a single purchase or upgrade purchase.
- Photoshop Express is an image editing and collage making mobile application from Adobe Inc. The app is available on iOS, Android and Windows phones and tablets. It can also be installed on Windows desktop via the Microsoft Store. Photoshop Express Editor has various features which can be used to enhance photos. In November 2016 Collage creation was introduced to Adobe Photoshop Express on iOS. They allow editing pictures in the smartphone or tablet rather than online. It can be used to showcase your latest art, ideas, or products. In the early days of the beta test, the product's terms of use raised controversy, in that it claimed to retain an irrevocable license to use certain works submitted by end users in perpetuity. At that time, Adobe held users of Photoshop Express to Adobe.com's general Terms of Use, which had not been drafted in contemplation of the sort of user-created content utilized in Photoshop Express. Following user concerns and negative press, Adobe issued new, more specialized Terms of Use for the Photoshop Express product that superseded sections of the General Terms, and clarified many of these issues. Changes included making the license expressly revocable and indicating that Adobe's rights to use the content are solely for the operation of Photoshop Express itself.
- Photoshop Fix is a photo retouching app for mobile devices marketed through Creative Cloud. The retouched images can be exported to the desktop version of Photoshop for further work.
- Photoshop Mix is a mobile application designed as a replacement for Photoshop Touch specifically for tablets and touchscreen devices. It includes many of the features of the personal computer version, including layers, selection tools, adjustments, and filters. Edited files could be synced with Creative Cloud.
- Photoshop Sketch is a drawing and painting app for mobile devices marketed through Creative Cloud. Sketches made can be exported to Photoshop. They can also be uploaded directly to the Bēhance social media platform.

=== Discontinued applications ===
- ActiveShare is a discontinued photo-sharing platform distributed by Adobe Systems. The Photoshop Album application replaced ActiveShare in 2003.
- Fireworks is a discontinued raster graphics editor for web designers. It could create interactive contents (e.g. buttons that change shape when the mouse cursor is hovered on) and animations.
- ImageReady is a discontinued raster graphics editor for web designers. It was discontinued on CS2 in favor of Fireworks.
- Photoshop Album is a piece of application software designed to import, organize and edit digital photos, and allows quick and easy searching and sharing of entire photo collections. It was initially released on February 18, 2003. The last version was Photoshop Album 3.2.0. It was discontinued in favor of Photoshop Elements. It has been compared to Apple Inc.'s iPhoto and Google's Picasa.
- Photoshop Limited Edition (LE) was a graphics editor for novice photographers and hobbyists. It contains most of the features of the professional version but with fewer and simpler options. It was instead replaced by Photoshop Elements in September 2000.
- Preview CC is an app for previewing mobile designs.

== See also ==
- Creative Cloud controversy
- Comparison of raster graphics editors
- Image editing
