= Adobe After Effects =

Digital motion graphics and compositing software

- Adobe After Effects 2025 running on Windows 10
- Original author: Company of Science and Art
- Developers: CoSA (1993); Aldus Corporation (1993–1994); Adobe (1994–present)
- Release: January 1993; 33 years ago
- Stable release: 2026 (26.5) / September 10, 2026; 58 days ago
- Written in: C/C++
- Operating system: Windows 10 (x64 only) V20H2 or later; macOS Monterey v12.0 or later
- Type: Visual effects, Motion graphics, Compositing, Computer animation
- License: Trialware, Proprietary, term
- Website: adobe.com/aftereffects

Adobe After Effects is a digital effects, motion graphics, and compositing application developed by Adobe Inc.; it is used for animation and in the post-production process of film making, video games and television production. Among other things, After Effects can be used for keying, tracking, compositing, and animation. It also functions as a very basic non-linear editor, audio editor, and media transcoder. In 2019, the program won an Academy Award for scientific and technical achievement.

== History ==
After Effects was originally created by David Herbstman, David Simons, Daniel Wilk, David M. Cotter, and Russell Belfer at the Company of Science and Art in Providence, Rhode Island. The first two versions of the software, 1.0 (January 1993) and 1.1, were released there by the company. CoSA with After Effects was acquired by Aldus Corporation in July 1993, which in turn was acquired by Adobe in 1994. Adobe acquired PageMaker as well. Adobe's first new release of After Effects was version 3.0.

== Third-party integrations ==
After Effects functionality can be extended through a variety of third-party integrations. The most common integrations are: plug-ins, scripts, and extensions.

=== Plug-in ===
Plug-ins are predominantly written in C or C++ and extend the functionality of After Effects, allowing for more advanced features such as particle systems, physics engines, 3D effects, and the ability to bridge the gap between After Effects and another.

=== Scripts ===
After Effects Scripts are a series of commands written in both JavaScript and the ExtendScript language.

After Effects Scripts, unlike plug-ins, can only access the core functionality of After Effects. Scripts are often developed to automate repetitive tasks, to simplify complex After Effects features, or to perform complex calculations that would otherwise take a long time to complete.

Scripts can also use some functionality not directly exposed through the graphical user interface.

=== Extensions ===
After Effects Extensions offer the ability to extend After Effects functionality through modern web development technologies like HTML5, and Node.js, without the need for C++.

After Effects Extensions make use of Adobe's Common Extensibility Platform or CEP Panels, which means they can be built to interact with other Adobe CC apps.

== See also ==
- Lottie (file format), a standard for the JSON export of an After Effects animation.
- After Effects Supported formats.
- Digital compositing
- Visual effects
