= Adobe Dreamweaver =

Proprietary web development software

- Adobe Dreamweaver 20.2 running on macOS Catalina
- Developers: Adobe (2005–present); Macromedia (before 2005)
- Release: December 1997; 28 years ago
- Stable release: 21.8.1 / July 2026
- Written in: C++
- Operating system: Windows 10 version 1903 and above, macOS 13 Ventura and above
- Type: HTML editor, programming tool, integrated development environment (IDE)
- License: Trialware software as a service
- Website: adobe.com/dreamweaver

Adobe Dreamweaver is a proprietary web development tool from Adobe. It was created by Macromedia in 1997 and developed by them until Macromedia was acquired by Adobe Systems in 2005.

Adobe Dreamweaver is available for the macOS and Windows operating systems.

Following Adobe's acquisition of the Macromedia product suite, releases of Dreamweaver subsequent to version 8.0 have been more compliant with W3C standards. Recent versions have improved support for Web technologies such as CSS, JavaScript, and various server-side scripting languages and frameworks, including ASP (ASP JavaScript, ASP VBScript, ASP.NET C#, ASP.NET VB), ColdFusion, Scriptlet, and PHP.

== Features ==
Adobe Dreamweaver CC is a web design integrated development environment (IDE) that is used to develop and design websites. Dreamweaver includes a code editor that supports syntax highlighting, code completion, real-time syntax checking, and code introspection for generating code hints to assist the user in writing code.

Dreamweaver, like other HTML editors, edits files locally, then uploads them to the remote web server using FTP, SFTP, or WebDAV. Dreamweaver CS4 supports the Subversion (SVN) version control system.

Since version 5, Dreamweaver supports syntax highlighting for the following languages:

- ActionScript
- Active Server Pages (ASP).
- C#
- Cascading Style Sheets (CSS)
- ColdFusion
- EDML
- Extensible HyperText Markup Language (XHTML)
- Extensible Markup Language (XML)
- Extensible Stylesheet Language Transformations (XSLT)
- HyperText Markup Language (HTML)
- Java
- JavaScript (JS)
- PHP
- Visual Basic (VB)
- Visual Basic Script Edition (VBScript)
- Wireless Markup Language (WML)

Support for Active Server Pages (ASP) and JavaServer Pages was dropped in version CS5.

Users can add their language syntax highlighting. Code completion is available for many of these languages.

== Internationalization and localization ==
=== Language availability ===
Adobe Dreamweaver CS6 is available in Brazilian Portuguese, Simplified Chinese, Traditional Chinese, Czech, Dutch, English, French, German, Italian, Japanese, Korean (Windows only), Polish, Russian, Spanish, Swedish, and Turkish.

=== Specific features for Arabic and Hebrew languages ===
The older Adobe Dreamweaver CS3 also features a Middle Eastern version that allows typing Arabic, Persian, Urdu, or Hebrew text – whose scripts are written from right to left – within the code view. Whether the text is fully Middle Eastern (written from right to left) or includes both English and Middle Eastern text (written left to right and right to left, respectively), it will be displayed properly.

== See also ==
- Adobe Creative Cloud
- Adobe Muse
- Web application
