= List of acquisitions by Adobe =

Adobe wordmark

Adobe Inc. is an American computer software company headquartered in San Jose, California. In 1982, John Warnock and Charles Geschke left Xerox PARC and established Adobe to develop and sell the PostScript page description language. Apple Computer licensed PostScript in 1985 for use in its LaserWriter printers, which helped spark the desktop publishing revolution. The company has acquired 25 companies, purchased stakes in five, and divested six, most of which were software companies. Of the companies that Adobe has acquired, 18 were based in the United States. Adobe has not released the financial details for most of these mergers and acquisitions.

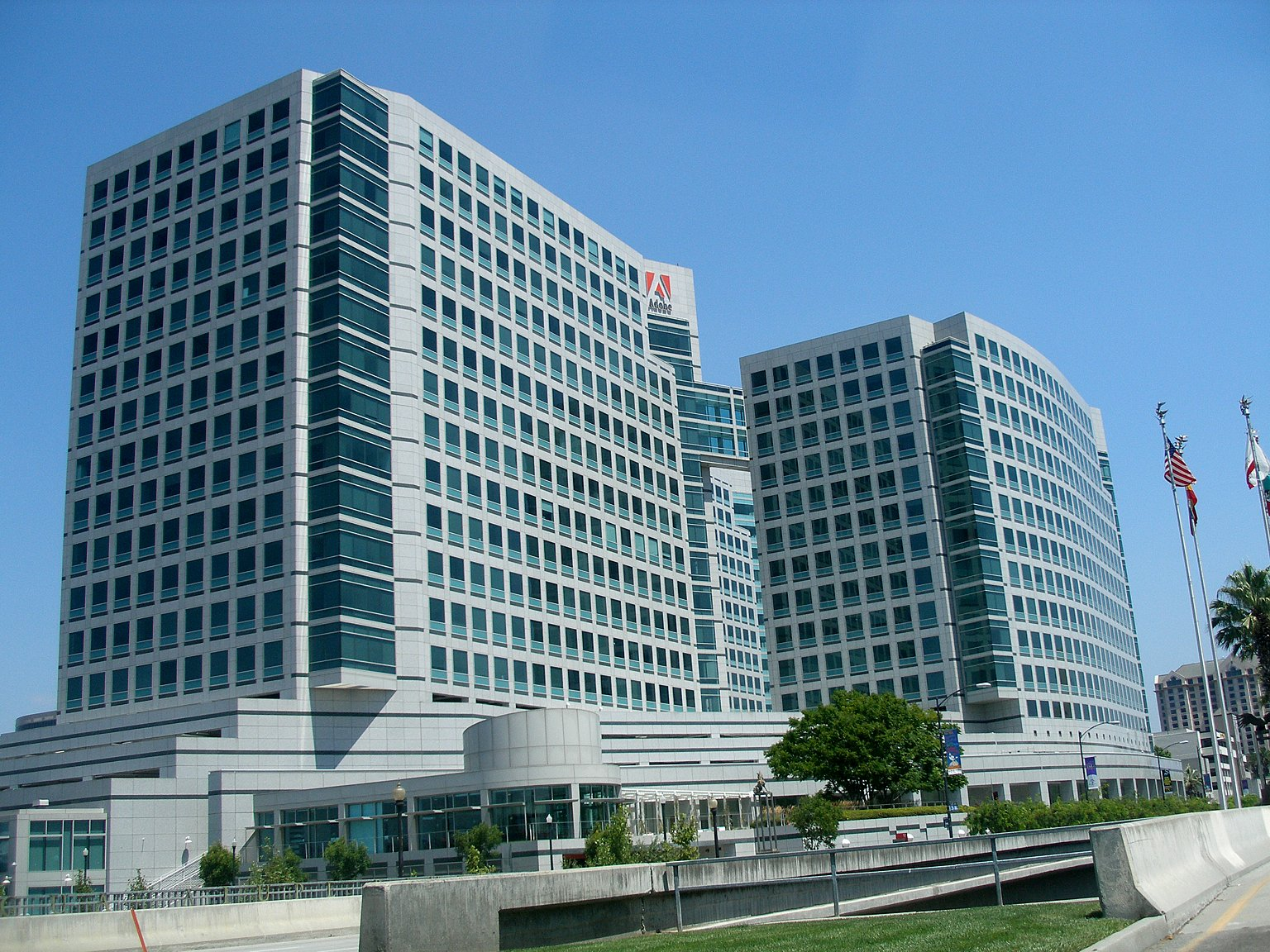
Adobe headquarters in San Jose

Adobe's first acquisition was Emerald City Software in March 1990. In August 1994, the company acquired Aldus Corporation, a Seattle-based software company credited with creating the desktop publishing industry with its PageMaker software. The company's products were integrated into Adobe's product line later in the year, and re-branded as Adobe PageMaker and Adobe After Effects; Aldus also owned the TIFF file format, transferring ownership to Adobe. In October 1995, Adobe acquired the desktop publishing software company Frame Technology for US$566 million, and re-branded its FrameMaker software to Adobe FrameMaker. Adobe acquired GoLive Systems in January 1999 and obtained its CyberStudio HTML editor software, releasing it as Adobe GoLive. In May 2003, Adobe acquired Syntrillium Software and its digital audio editor software Cool Edit Pro, and merged it into its product line, re-releasing it as Adobe Audition.

In the 1990s, Adobe purchased a minority stake in four companies, and it purchased a stake in one company in the 2000s. Adobe has also divested six companies, companies in which parts of the company are sold to another company. All of its divestments were made in the 1990s, with its most recent divestment made in August 1999 when it sold Macromedia Pathware to Lotus Development.

== Acquisitions ==
Number	Company	Country	Acquired on	Acquired for (USD)	Adjusted for Inflation (USD)	References
1	Emerald City Software	United States	March 19, 1990	—	—	
2	BluePoint Technologies	United States	June 20, 1990	—	—	
3	LaserTools-Language Tech (Note: Acquired from LaserTools)	United States	June 1, 1992	—	—	
4	OCR Systems	United States	June 29, 1992	—	—	
5	Nonlinear Technologies	United States	1992	—	—	
6	After Hours Software	United States	1993	—	—	
7	Compumation	United States	1994	—	—	
8	Aldus Corporation	United States	August 31, 1994	$437,676,000	$951,000,000	
9	LaserTools	United States	September 9, 1994	—	—	
10	Photoshop	United States	1995	—	—	
11	Frame Technology	United States	October 30, 1995	$566,567,000	$1.197×10^{9}	
12	Ares Software	United States	May 20, 1996	—	—	
13	Sandcastle	United States	March 14, 1997	$3,500,000	$7,000,000	
14	HyWay Ferranti	United Kingdom	September 5, 1997	—	—	
15	DigiDox	United States	September 16, 1997	—	—	
16	GoLive Systems	United States	January 4, 1999	—	—	
17	Fotiva	United States	December 5, 2001	—	—	
18	Accelio (Note: Acquired from Adobe Systems Canada)	Canada	April 15, 2002	$72,000,000	$129,000,000	
19	Syntrillium Software	United States	May 2003	—	—	
20	Yellow Dragon Software-Tech (Note: Acquired from Yellow Dragon Software)	United States	November 10, 2003	—	—	
21	Q-Link Technologies, Inc.	United States	May 3, 2004	—	—	
22	OKYZ	France	December 7, 2004	—	—	
23	Macromedia	United States	December 3, 2005	$3,573,000,000	$5.890×10^{9}	
24	Navisware	United States	December 16, 2005	—	—	
25	Trade and Technologies France	France	April 21, 2006	—	—	
26	Pixmantec	Denmark	June 26, 2006	—	—	
27	InterAKT	Romania	September 5, 2006	—	—	
28	Serious Magic Inc.	United States	October 19, 2006	—	—	
29	Scene7	United States	May 31, 2007	—	—	
30	Virtual Ubiquity	United States	October 1, 2007	—	—	
31	YaWah	Denmark	September 15, 2008	—	—	
32	Business Catalyst	Australia	August 31, 2009	—	—	
33	Omniture	United States	September 15, 2009	$1,800,000,000	$2.701×10^{9}	
34	Day Software	Switzerland	July 28, 2010	$240,000,000	$354,000,000	
35	Demdex	United States	January 18, 2011	—	—	
36	EchoSign	United States	July 18, 2011	—	—	
37	Iridas Technology	Germany	September 8, 2011	—	—	
38	Nitobi	Canada	October 3, 2011	—	—	
39	Typekit	United States	October 3, 2011	—	—	
40	Auditude	United States	November 1, 2011	$120,000,000	$172,000,000	
41	Efficient Frontier Technology	United States	November 30, 2011	—	—	
42	Behance Inc.	United States	December 21, 2012	—	—	
43	Neolane	France	July 23, 2013	$600,000,000	$829,000,000	
44	Satellite	United States	July 31, 2013	—	—	
45	Aviary	United States	September 22, 2014	—	—	
46	Fotolia	United States	January 28, 2015	$800,000,000	$1.087×10^{9}	
47	Mixamo	United States	June 1, 2015	—	—	
48	Livefyre	United States	May 10, 2016	—	—	
49	TubeMogul	United States	November 10, 2016	$540,000,000	$724,000,000	
50	Sayspring	United States	April 16, 2018	—	—	
51	Uru	United States	April 29, 2018	—	—	
52	Magento	United States	May 21, 2018	$1,680,000,000	$2.154×10^{9}	
53	Marketo	United States	September 20, 2018	$4,750,000,000	$6.090×10^{9}	
54	Allegorithmic	France	January 23, 2019	—	—	
55	Workfront	United States	November 9, 2020	$1,500,000,000	$1.866×10^{9}	
56	Frame.io	United States	October 7, 2021	$1,275,000,000	$1.515×10^{9}	
57	ContentCal	United Kingdom	December 8, 2021	—	—	
58	Abstract Notebooks	United States	December 23, 2021	—	—	
59	rephrase.ai	India	2023	—	—	
60	Film Impact	Netherlands	September 2025	—	—	
61	Semrush	United States	November 19, 2025	$1,900,000,000	$1.900×10^{9}	
62	Topaz Labs	United States	June 25, 2026	$3,400,000,000	$3.400×10^{9}	
63	Rilo	United States	September 2, 2026	—	—	

=== Indirect acquisitions ===
Adobe also owns the assets of numerous companies, through less direct means, through the mergers or acquisitions of companies later acquired by Adobe.

- Company of Science and Art (CoSA)
  - Acquired by Aldus
- Allaire Corporation
  - Acquired by Macromedia
- Live Software
  - Acquired by Allaire Corporation
- Authorware Inc
  - Merged to form Macromedia
- MacroMind
  - Merged to form MacroMind-Paracomp
- Paracomp
  - Merged to form MacroMind-Paracomp
- Altsys
  - Acquired by Macromedia
- MacroMind-Paracomp
  - Merged to form Macromedia
- iBand Software
  - Acquired by Macromedia
- FutureWave Software
  - Acquired by Macromedia
- Andromedia Corporation
  - Acquired by Macromedia
- Presedia
  - Acquired by Macromedia
- eHelp Corporation
  - Acquired by Macromedia
- nHabit.com
  - Merged with GoodHome.com (Scene7)
- Engage
  - Assets acquired by Scene7
- Cascade
  - Acquired by Scene7
- MidSystems
  - Acquired by Scene7
- TrueSpectra
  - Acquired by Scene7
- Touch Clarity
  - Acquired by Omniture
- Visual Sciences, Inc. (formerly WebSideStory)
  - Acquired by Omniture
- Offermatica
  - Acquired by Omniture
- Mercado
  - Acquired by Omniture
- Context Optional
  - Acquired by Efficient Frontier
  - Wrike***

=== Failed acquisitions ===
- Figma - After 15 months of regulatory review, the acquisition of Figma for $20 billion was abandoned after no longer seeing a path toward regulatory approval.

== Stakes ==
Date	Company	Business	Country	Value (USD)	Adjusted (USD)	References
September 21, 1992	Verity	Computer consulting	United States	—	—	
March 1, 1994	Crosswise	Applications software	United States	—	—	
April 19, 1995	Siebel Systems	Application services provider	United States	—	—	
August 8, 1995	Fractal Design	Graphics software	United States	$2,000,000	$4,000,000	
March 23, 2007	Skysoft	Online digital music services	Republic of China	$1,000,000	$2,000,000	

== Divestitures ==
Date	Acquirer	Target company	Target business	Acquirer country	Value (USD)	Adjusted (USD)	References
November 1, 1991	Paracomp	MacroMind	Software	United States	—	—	
March 28, 1996	—	Luminous (Note: Adobe retained a 19.9% stake in Luminous)	Graphics software	United States	—	—	
February 5, 1997	INSO	MasterSoft	Publishing software	United States	$3,000,000	$6,000,000	
March 24, 1999	Creative Internet Solutions	ChangeMedia	Internet service provider	United States	—	—	
May 20, 1999	Calian Technologies Ltd.	Why Interactive	Multi-media company	Canada	$4,360,000	$8,000,000	
August 30, 1999	Lotus Development	Macromedia Pathware	Internet software	United States	—	—	

== See also ==
- List of largest mergers and acquisitions
- Lists of corporate acquisitions and mergers
