= The Business Cloud =

Application programming interface

The Business Cloud logo

The Business Cloud is an API enabled self-service platform, developed by Domo, that provides an array of services like data connection and data visualization.

== History ==
Domo, Inc. was founded in 2010 by Josh James who also co-founded the web analytics software company Omniture in 1996, which he took public in 2006.

Domo launched the Domo Appstore, with 1,000 apps with social and mobile capabilities, in 2016. This appstore creates a network of business apps and an ecosystem of companies into a single, integrated business cloud. This decision came after Domo announced a $131 million round of funding from BlackRock.

According to the company, the concept behind The Business Cloud is to connect smaller clouds relating to apps or other functional areas of a business into a single business cloud that allows self-service and other social features to customers.

== Services ==
The Business Cloud is offered as a free service, claimed to be the world's first business cloud with Domo appstore as one of its core services. This free package includes all of the Domo's features and functionality including Domo platform, Domo Apps, visualizations, alerts, company directories, org charts, profiles, tasks and Domo Mobile. The Business Cloud allows customers to leverage their preferred cloud as well as on-premises software and monitor all aspects of their business in routine.

The company is supported by a $500 million fund from investors all over the world.

== See also ==
- Google Cloud Connect
- Cloud access security broker
