= Exigen Services =

Exigen Services Merged with Return on Intelligence
- Industry: IT Consulting, Commercial software, Insurance
- Founded: 1999
- Headquarters: Philadelphia, United States
- Number of locations: 12 operations and delivery centers
- Key people: Gordon Brooks (President and CEO), Jonathan Kalman (President, Global Insurance Solutions), Alex Kreymer (COO), David Carpini (President, Commercial Software Solutions & Technology Solutions)
- Services: Advisory Services, Analytics & Data, Omni-Channel & Customer Experience, Core Systems Transformations, and Commercial Software Solutions
- Number of employees: 1000 (2014)
- Website: http://returnonintelligence.com

Exigen Services recently merged and renamed to Emergn. Insurance Software production under Exigen Insurance Solutions has separated and was renamed to EIS.

== History ==
Exigen Group was founded in 1999 by Alec Miloslavsky and Greg Shenkman. They are the entrepreneurs behind Genesys Labs, which has been sold twice for over $1 billion. Most recently, Genesys was acquired by Permira, a leading private equity firm.

The company started with the goal of developing Business Process Utilities (BPU): business process automation solutions for the insurance and financial services industries. Over the years, Exigen Services demonstrated stable growth and expansion to other markets, acquiring IT companies along the way, including SoftwareHouse (SWH), a high-tech research and development firm located in Riga, Latvia; and DATI, the largest systems development organization in the Baltic States.

In 2006, Exigen Services was spun off to form a separate company providing application development services, while Exigen Capital, a private equity firm, focused on IT-based transformation investments.

In 2007, Exigen Services merged with StarSoft Developments Labs, an application outsourcing provider specializing in Agile application development with delivery centers in Russia and other CIS countries.

In 2009, Exigen Services acquired China-based software outsourcing company, Taihoo Technology.

In 2013, Exigen Services merged with Return on Intelligence. The company is rebranding to "Return on Intelligence." Return on Intelligence was named to Global Services 100 list.

In 2015 Exigen Insurance Solutions has separated from Exigen Services to a separate company to work on a Core Insurance Software called IPB and EIS Suite afterwards.

In 2018 remaining Exigen Services and Return On Intelligence were acquired by Emergn consulting company and operate under its supervision up till now.

== Geography ==
Headquartered in Philadelphia, PA, the company operates delivery centers, located in the following cities:

- Philadelphia, Pennsylvania; Boston, Maine and San Francisco, California (United States)
- Saint Petersburg, and Nizhny Novgorod, Russia
- Riga, Liepāja and Jelgava, Latvia
- Dnipro, Ukraine
- Adelaide, Australia

== Technologies and methodologies ==
Technologies used in Exigen Services’ projects include the following:

- Java EE is a core technology in many of the company’s implemented projects.
- Microsoft technologies play a significant role in many projects, and company affiliates in Russia and the Baltics are Microsoft Gold Certified Partners.
- Document management, human resources, and many other solutions have been developed on the basis of IBM Lotus Notes/Domino technologies, and the company is an IBM Business Partner.
- .NET-based projects play a considerable role in the Exigen Services portfolio.
- Many Exigen Services projects have been based on Exigen technologies, including Exigen VisiFLOW, Exigen Workflow, Exigen Process Backbone, and Exigen Insurance Process Backbone.
- In the Baltic States, development teams include mainframe specialists familiar with Assembler, Cobol, FORTRAN, and PL/1.
- In China, special areas of expertise include mobile system development for the following platforms: iPhone, BlackBerry, Windows Mobile, Android, and Symbian; Oracle PLM consulting; web conference systems, including products such as WebEx and GoToMeeting; and web application development based on PHP, Ruby on Rails, and Adobe Flex/AS/Flash.

In terms of methodology, Exigen Services has been using distributed Agile methods, including Scrum, for systems development since 2002. Dr. Jeff Sutherland, an author of the Agile Manifesto and one of the co-inventors of Scrum, has recognized the expertise of Exigen Services in global distributed team management for large-scale Agile projects.

== Industrial ==
- Insurance. Exigen Services and its partner, Exigen Insurance Solutions, have worked closely on several joint projects for the insurance industry. The basic technologies used in these projects are owned by Exigen Insurance Solutions. One of them is Exigen Insurance Process Backbone, which supports the automation of most core business processes of insurance companies. The new generation of Exigen Insurance Process Backbone is named Exigen Suite, and includes components such as PolicyCore and ClaimCore.
- Government. The company now known as Exigen Services has been providing software development and maintenance services to governmental institutions for nearly 20 years. In 1990, the founders of what is today Exigen Services Latvia started work on their first international project, the Artists Social Insurance System for a German government agency (Landesversicherungsanstalt Oldenburg/Bremen). In recent years, projects have been executed for numerous government clients in Latvia, including the Latvian Parliament, the Treasury of the Republic of Latvia, the Latvian State Revenue Service, the Latvian Postal Service, and the Riga City Council. Government sector clients in other countries have included the Ministry of Economy and Planning in Saudi Arabia and the Ministry of Labor and Taxes of Denmark (in joint projects with CSC).
- Financial. Exigen Services counts many banks among its customers. For example, in Latvia, the company developed a Data Warehouse System for Mortgage bank (Hipoteku banka). Other customer in the financial services sector is SEB.
- Telecom. T-Mobile has been a client of Exigen Services (formerly StarSoft) since 2004. Exigen Services runs an Offshore Development Center, employing an average of 160 employees, for T-Mobile projects. Other Exigen customers in the telecommunications field include Bell Aliant and Tele2 Latvia.
- Media. In 2004, two major record labels founded a joint venture with Exigen aimed at the development of a Shared Royalty Platform, a system for automatic calculation of the royalties, i.e., payments allocated to artists, producers and publishers for each purchase or view of copyrighted materials. Exigen Services provided its expertise in the development of this solution.
- Healthcare. One of the oldest clients of Exigen Services (formerly StarSoft) is a Danish affiliate of CSC. LABKA II, a joint project of Exigen Services and Computer Sciences Corporation since 2001, developed a complex laboratory information system for automatic collection of clinical analyses aimed to meet the demands of hospitals and clinical laboratories. The LABKA II system has been in use since 2007.
- Another example of a medical project is a partnership with Sesame Communications for the creation of an online communications solution for dental and orthodontic offices.
- High tech. Like many Eastern European application outsourcing vendors, Exigen Services has a number of clients in the high tech industry. Among them there are Sun Microsystems, Intel; Macromedia (Adobe) and Omniture.
- Logistics/warehouse. In 1999-2003, Exigen Services, together with Berghof, executed a series of projects for end customers such as Adidas, Schreyer, Busch-Jäger, etc.

=== Patron of the University of Latvia ===
Exigen Services Latvia is a silver patron of the University of Latvia. Supports the University of Latvia since 2003 by donating to educational, scientific and cultural projects, including the participation of students of the University of Latvia in international programming competitions.
