= Visual science =

Visual Science may refer to:

- Vision science, the scientific study of vision
- The study of optics, ophthalmology, and optometry.

== See also ==
- Visual Science, a Scottish video game company founded in 1993
- Visual Sciences, an American web analytics tool and link directory founded in 1996
