= Hitbox (disambiguation) =

Hitbox may refer to:

- Hitbox, virtual collision detection tool
- Hitbox (web analytics), web analytics software
- Hitbox.tv, defunct video streaming service
- Hitbox, a brand and type of leverless arcade controller
