= Livefyre =

- Website type: Hosted Internet forums
- Owner: Adobe Systems
- Website: web.livefyre.com
- Commercial: Yes
- Launched: December 2009
- Current status: Shut down (November 2021)

Livefyre was a blog comment hosting service that pioneered real-time comment sections on the web. Its products delivered content live without a page refresh and synchronized posts from Twitter and Facebook into on-page conversations; the company later expanded into live blogging, user profiles, link aggregation, web annotation, media uploads, moderation tools, and the curation of user-generated content for brand marketing. The company was based in San Francisco with offices in New York, London, and Sydney. Livefyre was acquired by Adobe in 2016 and shut down in 2021.

== History ==
Livefyre was launched by Jordan Kretchmer and Henry Arlander in December 2009. Kretchmer founded the company on the premise that static comment sections had become disconnected from conversations taking place on social networks. It began as a commenting platform for bloggers. The company's commenting platform, Livefyre Comments 3, was launched in July 2012.

In September 2012, Livefyre launched StreamHub, a platform that extended its commenting system with live blogging, live chat, and real-time curation of social media content into publisher websites. Its real-time tools were adopted by major media companies including The New York Times, CBS, Fox, NBCUniversal, and Newsweek/The Daily Beast, and news outlets such as CNN and Fox News used the platform to display live comment streams during events such as political debates. In August 2013, Livefyre launched its Social Native Ad Solutions group. In November 2014, Livefyre launched a content marketing and engagement marketing platform called Livefyre Studio.

On September 9, 2013, Livefyre purchased the social media service Storify. At that time approximately 850,000 journalists, agencies and brands used Storify to curate collections of social media content. In November 2013, Livefyre acquired the social analytics platform Realtidbits.

In February 2015, Livefyre announced $47 million in new funding, consisting of a $15 million addition to its Series C round and a $32 million Series D round led by Adobe and Salesforce Ventures, reported as the first joint investment by the two companies. The funding brought the company's total raised to approximately $67 million; at the time, Livefyre served about 1,500 customers, including AOL, Condé Nast, Sony PlayStation, and Universal Music Group. By early 2016, the company had repositioned its products as the "Livefyre Engagement Cloud", comprising a user-generated content repository called Social Library alongside conversation and visualization applications, reflecting a shift in focus from publisher comment sections toward user-generated content marketing for brands.

In May 2016, Adobe Systems purchased Livefyre. At the time of the acquisition, Livefyre had roughly 150 employees, and its technology was integrated into Adobe Experience Manager and the Adobe Marketing Cloud. In October 2016, Livefyre shut down its Community Comments WordPress plugin in order to focus exclusively on enterprise-level customers.

On December 12, 2017, Storify announced that they would be shutting down the service on May 16, 2018. Existing Storify users were encouraged to use the Storify 2 features built into Livefyre.

In January 2021, Adobe began transitioning Livefyre users away to alternate commenting platforms. On November 30 of that year, the company shut down Livefyre for all customers.
