= Zeta Global =

Technology firm

Zeta Global Holdings Corp.
- Type: Public
- Traded as: NYSE: ZETA
- Industry: Business software
- Founded: 2007
- Headquarters: New York City, New York, United States
- Key people: David A. Steinberg (CEO)
- Revenue: ▲US$1.30 billion (2025)
- Net income: ▲ −US$31.5 million (2025)
- Website: zetaglobal.com

Zeta Global Holdings Corp. is an American marketing technology company founded in 2007. Zeta offers companies a suite of multichannel marketing tools focused on creating, maintaining, and monetizing customer relationships. The company went public on the New York Stock Exchange on June 10, 2021, at a US$1.7 billion valuation.

The company's headquarters is in New York City, with 15 offices worldwide, in 11 countries, including Silicon Valley, London, and Hyderabad in India. Zeta has more than 1,300 employees worldwide. David A. Steinberg is the company's CEO. Forbes reported that the company had been referred to as a unicorn – a "billion-dollar startup". According to The Wall Street Journal, as of March 2020, the company is profitable, with annual revenues exceeding $400 million.

== History ==
David A. Steinberg and former Apple Inc. CEO John Sculley founded Zeta Global in 2007 under the name 'XL Marketing'. The company changed its name to Zeta Interactive in 2014, then again to 'Zeta Global' in October 2016. As of April 2017, Zeta had bought nine companies in the past nine years. In July 2015, the company raised $125 million from Blackstone's GSO Capital Partners to grow its business through the acquisition of data startup companies.

In November 2013, Zeta acquired the Adchemy Actions division from ad tech firm Adchemy to incorporate their 'machine learning'-based advertising platform. In January 2014, Zeta acquired Clicksquared, a Boston-based company that created 'The Hub,' a SaaS-based, cross-channel campaign management platform. In late 2015, they acquired the customer relationship management division of eBay's Enterprise operation in a deal which sources near the company said was worth $80–90 million. CEO Steinberg said the deal "gets us a long way toward becoming the largest customer lifecycle management platform." In August 2016, they announced that they had purchased the marketing automation tool 'Acxiom Impact' from marketing technology and services company Acxiom, in a deal which sources said was worth more than $50 million.

In October 2016, Zeta Global hired Jarrod Yahes as CFO. Yahes is a former senior finance executive at EXL Service Holdings, who previously served as the CFO of Jackson Hewitt. In March 2020, Christopher Greiner became CFO of Zeta Global. In April 2017, Zeta appointed Donald Steele as the company's first-ever CRO. That same month, the company raised $140 million in a large late-stage equity and debt funding round, with funds coming from GPI Capital and Franklin Square Capital Partners. Forbes reported that sources close to the company said this raised the company's valuation to $1.3 billion. On July 18, 2017, Zeta acquired machine-learning-centric platform Boomtrain. Steinberg said the company planned to integrate "its machine learning, decisioning and marketing automation in our entire marketing cloud." On December 5, 2017, Zeta Global acquired Disqus.

In 2018–2020, Zeta made several key ad tech acquisitions. In 2019, Zeta Global acquired Temnos, a Silicon Valley AI company. Steinberg, a co-founder of Zeta Global, stated that Temnos "allows us to see everything on the Internet from an intent perspective. It lets us see what people are reading and what is trending globally." Also in 2019, Zeta acquired demand-side and data management platform ad tech company Sizmek after it filed for bankruptcy. The deal was estimated at around $36 million, integrating a programmatic ad buying platform into Zeta's data software. During this period, Zeta also acquired Rocket Fuel's data management platform, IgnitionOne's demand side platform, and PlaceIQ's managed media business to further expand its marketing tech capabilities. In March 2021, Zeta announced an additional $222.5 million in new debt financing ahead of filing for its initial public offering. Zeta went public on the New York Stock Exchange on June 10, 2021, at a $1.7 billion valuation under the symbol ZETA.

== Products ==
As of 2019, the company has a database of permission-based profiles for approximately 750 million+ people. Using big data analysis, it identifies which companies to sell to, contacts those people, and manages existing customers. The Zeta Marketing Platform (ZMP) is the largest omnichannel marketing platform with identity data at its core. While the company originally focused on email marketing, it has more recently expanded into the customer lifecycle management market.

The ZMP combines customer data platform (CDP), email service provider (ESP), and demand-side platform (DSP) capabilities.

== Activities and events ==
On January 30, 2014, Zeta Interactive hosted a forum on changes in advertising and marketing over the years, using Apple's 1984 commercial as a benchmark. Sculley shared the panel with advertising executive David Sable, Global CEO of Young & Rubicam; Jessica Gelman, Vice President of Customer Marketing and Strategy; The Kraft Group – the owners of the New England Patriots; and Hooman Radfar, chairman and co-founder of marketing firm AddThis.

Zeta Live is an annual conference hosted by Zeta Global, held each year in New York City since its inaugural edition in November 2021.
