= Wirefly =

Portal to compare smartphone plans

- Industry: Wireless
- Founded: 1999
- Headquarters: USA
- Area served: USA
- Key people: Logan Abbott, President
- Products: Cell phones and wireless plans
- Number of employees: < 1,000
- Parent: InPhonic until 2007 bankruptcy, Simplexity from 2007 until May 2014, Wind N Sea Technology partners May 2014 to present

Wirefly is a cell phone plans and smartphone comparison website. Before being relaunched in May 2014, Wirefly was an online retailer of wireless services and devices operated by parent company Simplexity. Wirefly was headquartered in Reston, Virginia and maintained technology and operations centers in Largo, Maryland. Wirefly also operated a YouTube channel, which provides video reviews and comparisons of hot products.

== History ==
Simplexity assumed control of Wirefly.com in November 2007, after purchasing the assets of InPhonic in 2006. Inphonic had filed a voluntary petition for reorganization under Chapter 11 of the U.S. Bankruptcy Code. The filings were made in the U.S. Bankruptcy Court for the District of Delaware, and NASDAQ later delisted the company's shares, making them no longer available to the public. Many of Inphonic's assets, including its electronic commerce operations and its Wirefly.com website, were subsequently sold to private investors who used those assets to launch the company Simplexity in January 2008. On March 12, 2014, Wirefly closed down, and is in Chapter 11 bankruptcy. Wirefly was relaunched in May 2014.

As of April 2014, the Simplexity assets (excluding the Wirefly.com domain name) have been approved for sale to Wal-Mart for approximately US$10 million.

== Reception ==
Wirefly has received a number of Internet awards, including Forbes magazine's "Best of the Web" for 2004 and Keynote Systems' "Best In Overall Customer Experience" in 2005.

Wirefly's video reviews and comparisons of hot products on YouTube have received more than 5.5 million views. This channel held a Global Rank of 6,935,491 on Alexa.com as of July 29, 2013.
