= InPhonic =

American company

- Industry: Wireless
- Founded: 1999
- Founder: David A. Steinberg
- Headquarters: Washington, DC, USA
- Area served: USA
- Key people: David A. Steinberg, John Sculley, Jack Kemp, Ira Brind, Lawrence E. Harris, Blake Bath
- Products: Cell phones and wireless plans
- Revenue: ▲US$320.5 million (2006)
- Net income: ▼US$38.2 million (2006)
- Number of employees: < 1,000

InPhonic Inc was an American company which sold wireless services and devices online, both through its own electronic commerce sites and through private labeled websites it created and managed for online retailers. The company was headquartered in Washington, DC and maintained technology and operations centers in Largo, Maryland.

== History ==
InPhonic was founded in 1999 by David A. Steinberg who resigned in 2007 due to poor debt management and decreasing revenues. Its board of directors included former Vice-Presidential candidate Jack Kemp and technology/marketing guru John Sculley (of PepsiCo and Apple Computer fame).

The company was modeled after sites like Expedia, gathering information from companies into a single site to help customers find deals by comparing services and prices. Wireless carriers did business with InPhonic because acquiring a customer through the company can be less expensive than traditional marketing approaches designed to generate sales at a brick-and-mortar store. InPhonic, in turn, received a commission from carriers for each new account generated, once the customer met a number of criteria. InPhonic helped grow this market for third-party activations to nearly 50% of all newly acquired cell phone subscribers in the U.S.

The company's central online storefront, Wirefly.com, received a number of Internet awards, including Forbes magazine's "Best of the Web" for 2004 and Keynote System's "Best In Overall Customer Experience" in 2005.

In addition to operating Wirefly.com, InPhonic powered the technology platform and fulfillment system of 6,000 other private label cell phone sales Web sites. In early 2006, the firm claimed that it was the largest third-party online cell phone retailer in the US, accounting for one-third of the market, and that it sold 850,000 cell phones in 2005 alone. In June 2006, the company said that it had completed more than 2.5 million cellphone activations in the past three years.

On November 8, 2007, InPhonic filed a voluntary petition for reorganization under Chapter 11 of the U.S. Bankruptcy Code. The filings were made in the U.S. Bankruptcy Court for the District of Delaware. The company's stock was later delisted by NASDAQ. Many of the assets of Inphonic, including its electronic commerce operations and its Wirefly.com web site, were subsequently sold to private investors who used those assets to launch the company Simplexity in January 2008.

== Financials ==
In September 2001, the company closed a $19 million Series D round of capital financing headed by Core Capital Partners. The investment also included new investors McAndrews & Forbes, First Analysis, Spring Capital and Wynnefield Capital. All previous investors—including Sculley Brothers Investments, CMS Financial Services, and Mid Atlantic Venture Funds—participated as well. In 2003, Technology Crossover Ventures invested an additional $56 million in the company.

The company went public in November 2004. The company raised $108.9 million through its initial public offering. The IPO was InPhonic's second attempt to tap the public markets; the company filed to go public in 2002 but canceled the offering because of stock market conditions at the time.

In November 2006, Goldman Sachs—one of InPhonic’s largest shareholders—made the company a proposal to provide it with $100 million in debt financing, part of which InPhonic used for a large stock buy-back.

In November 2007, InPhonic filed a Chapter 11 petition in the United States Bankruptcy Court for the District of Delaware. InPhonic, along with its co-debtors, requested that their cases be jointly administered under case number 07-11166. Related to the Chapter 11 petition, InPhonic agreed to sell substantially all of its assets to an affiliate of Philadelphia-based private equity firm Versa Capital. In December 2007, the company's stock was delisted by NASDAQ.

InPhonic attributed its bankruptcy filing, in part, to a recent default under a prepetition credit agreement, as well as illiquidity and declining revenues caused by unprofitable marketing activities and an inability to maintain adequate inventory of the most popular wireless devices. InPhonic’s top creditor list read like a who’s who of the nation’s top technology companies. MSN, Yahoo!, Google, America Online, and Verizon all rank among the debtor’s top ten creditors.

In January 2008, Versa Capital announced that InPhonic's assets and infrastructure were being used to launch a new company named Simplexity. This new company was based in Reston, VA and led by CEO Andy Zeinfeld. Simplexity's assets were subsequently purchased by Walmart in 2014.

== Some cell phone sites which InPhonic operated ==
Cell phone sites operated by InPhonic included: A1 Wireless, ACN Wireless, Cellular Buys, Cellular Choices, Corporate Wireless, FonCentral, INTELENET Wireless, Liberty Wireless, lowcostcells.com, Mobile Pro, Phone Deals, Simplexity, Talking on Air, Wirefly, Wireless Marketplace, WorldPerks Wireless Service, and Mylan Cellular.

== Rebates ==
InPhonic maintained an unsatisfactory rating with the Better Business Bureau serving Washington DC and Eastern Pennsylvania. Over the 36 months preceding October 2007 the BBB had processed 126 unresolved consumer complaints regarding selling practices, advertising issues, service issues among other areas of concern.

In April 2007, the FCC settled rebate related charges against InPhonic. The Commission alleged that InPhonic, in connection with its advertised rebate offers, failed to provide promised documents needed to obtain rebates, to send out rebate checks, and to adequately disclose material terms and conditions prior to consumers purchases. The FCC further alleged that InPhonic misled some consumers about the number of wireless bills that had to be submitted with their rebate application and misrepresented that consumers would have a reasonable opportunity to resubmit rebate applications that were deemed incomplete. InPhonic was ordered to pay consumers who applied for a rebate with the company but were denied a check based on the company’s deceptive and unfair practices.

InPhonic earlier settled similar charges leveled by the District of Columbia attorney general.

A large number of InPhonic's customers complained about the non-fulfillment of rebates that were promised to customers. Many of these customers were listed as non-secured creditors in the company's Chapter 11 filing in 2007.

== Partnerships and affiliates ==
InPhonic had established relationships with a range of e-commerce partners to provide wireless activation services. Its partners included high-profile brands such as Radio Shack, Best Buy, Overstock.com, Buy.com and AOL; industry players like Cognigen Networks and Intelisys; and major U.S. carriers Verizon Wireless, Cingular, Sprint, T-Mobile, Alltel and others. InPhonic also ran fulfillment for original equipment manufacturers like the Motorola and LG brands.

A deal signed with Disney in April 2006 was the first deal for the company's mobile virtual network enabler (MVNE) division after the company shed its own mobile virtual network operator (MVNO), Liberty Wireless, in 2005.

In April 2006, InPhonic finalized a partnership with Amazon.com to become Amazon's first third-party provider of wireless products.
