= Discourse (software) =

Internet forum software (released 2014)

- Developers: Civilized Discourse Construction Kit, Inc.
- Initial release: August 26, 2014 (11 years ago)
- Stable release: v2026.1.0 / 8 January 2026
- Written in: Ruby, JavaScript
- Operating system: Linux
- Available in: Albanian, Arabic, Bosnian, Chinese, Czech, Danish, Dutch, English, Estonian, Finnish, French, Galician, German, Greek, Hebrew, Indonesian, Italian, Japanese, Korean, Norwegian, Persian, Polish, Portuguese, Romanian, Russian, Slovak, Spanish, Swedish, Telugu, Turkish, Ukrainian, Urdu, Vietnamese
- Type: Forum software
- License: GNU GPL version 2 (or later)
- Website: www.discourse.org
- Repository: github.com/discourse/discourse

Discourse is an open source Internet forum system released on August 26, 2014. It was founded by Jeff Atwood, Robin Ward, and Sam Saffron.

The client side application is written in EmberJS. The server side is written in Ruby on Rails and backed by a PostgreSQL database and Redis cache. The source code is distributed under the GNU General Public License version 2.

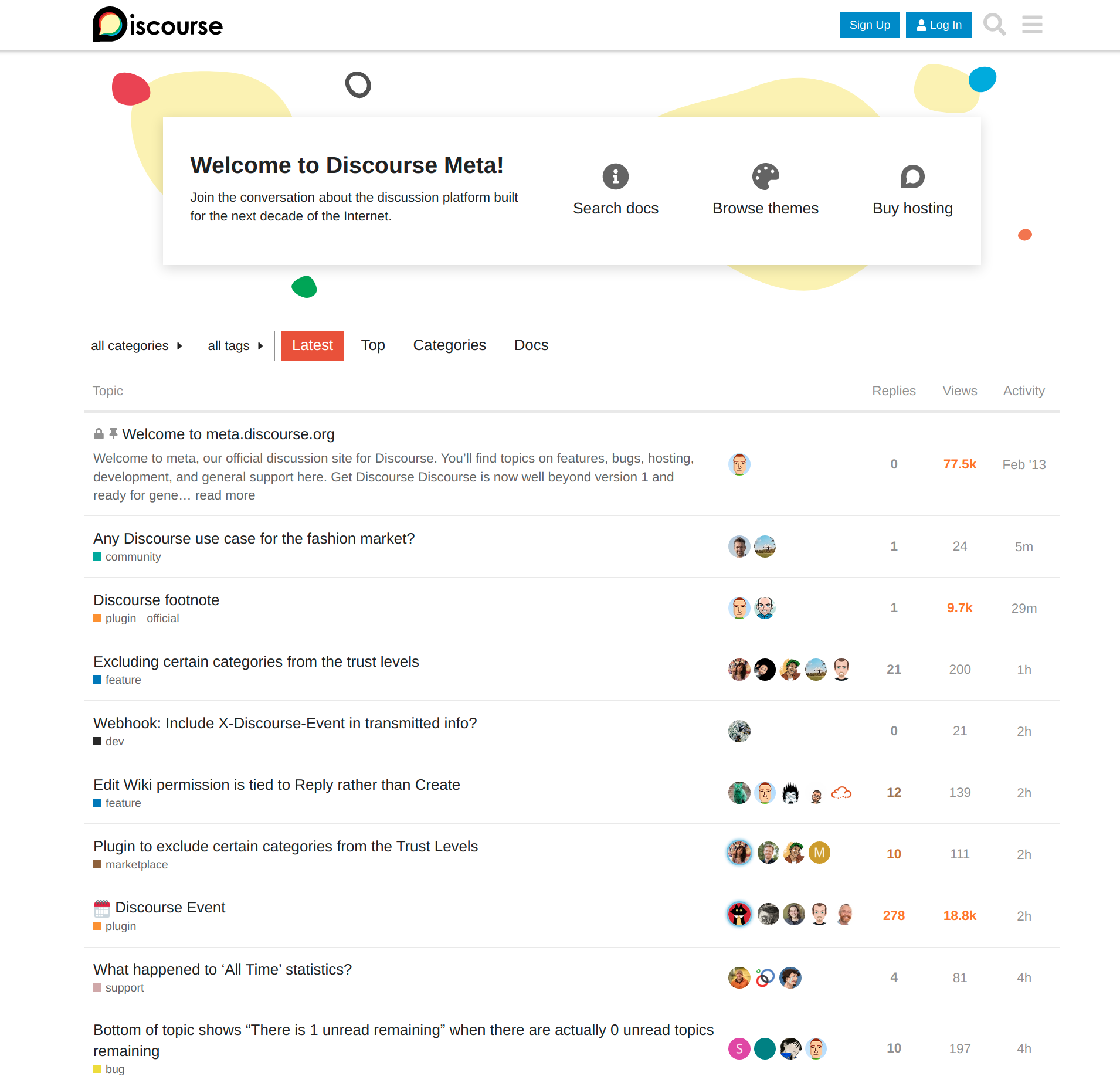
The default homepage in Discourse

== Features ==
=== Categorization ===
Similar discussions can be organized under categories. Admins can create categories, add category descriptions and logos, and control access to topics in the category. Discourse provides granular control over read/write permissions.

Discourse also supports sub-categorization or nested categories. Subcategories are categories in themselves so they can be controlled in the same manner as parent categories. The only difference is the parent-child relationship.

=== Tagging ===
Tags are a lightweight alternative to categories, but they can also be used in conjunction.

=== Topics ===
Conversations in Discourse are organized into topics. Users are able to create new topics or reply to existing ones. Categories and tags can be assigned to topics which makes them follow the security rules for those if applicable.

A topic consists of the initial post as well as any subsequent replies to it. Replies in Discourse follow a flat chronological order as opposed to being threaded. The Discourse core developers believe that threading replies is detrimental to the health of the overall discussion. Users can interact with each post independently. They can take actions such as reply, like, bookmark, quote or flag for moderation.

=== Trust levels ===
The user trust system is a "fundamental cornerstone of Discourse". Discourse's trust levels sandbox new users so that they cannot accidentally hurt themselves or other users, while granting experienced users more rights over time so that they can help maintain and moderate the community.

The five trust levels are New, Basic, Member, Regular, and Leader.

As users become more experienced, their trust level is raised, granting more rights and access to more features.

=== Discourse narrative bot ===
Discobot is a customizable bot that introduces new users to many of the platform's features like bookmarking a topic, embedded link previews ("oneboxing"), emojis, mentions, basic formatting, uploading images, flagging posts, and searching.

=== Personal messages ===
In addition to public and private topics, users on Discourse have the ability to send personal messages to other members in the community. Users receive notifications for personal messages and can add or remove members to a message at any time. Each user has a personal inbox that contains all of their sent and received messages.

=== Groups ===
Admins can create groups and add members to them. Groups can be used to manage access to certain categories, and for group mentions and group messages.

When Discourse is installed, it creates automatic groups for administrators, moderators, staff, and the five trust levels. Custom groups can set to either public or private. Users can add themselves to a group or request to be added by the group owners. Users can also be automatically added to a group during signup based on their email address.

=== Editor ===
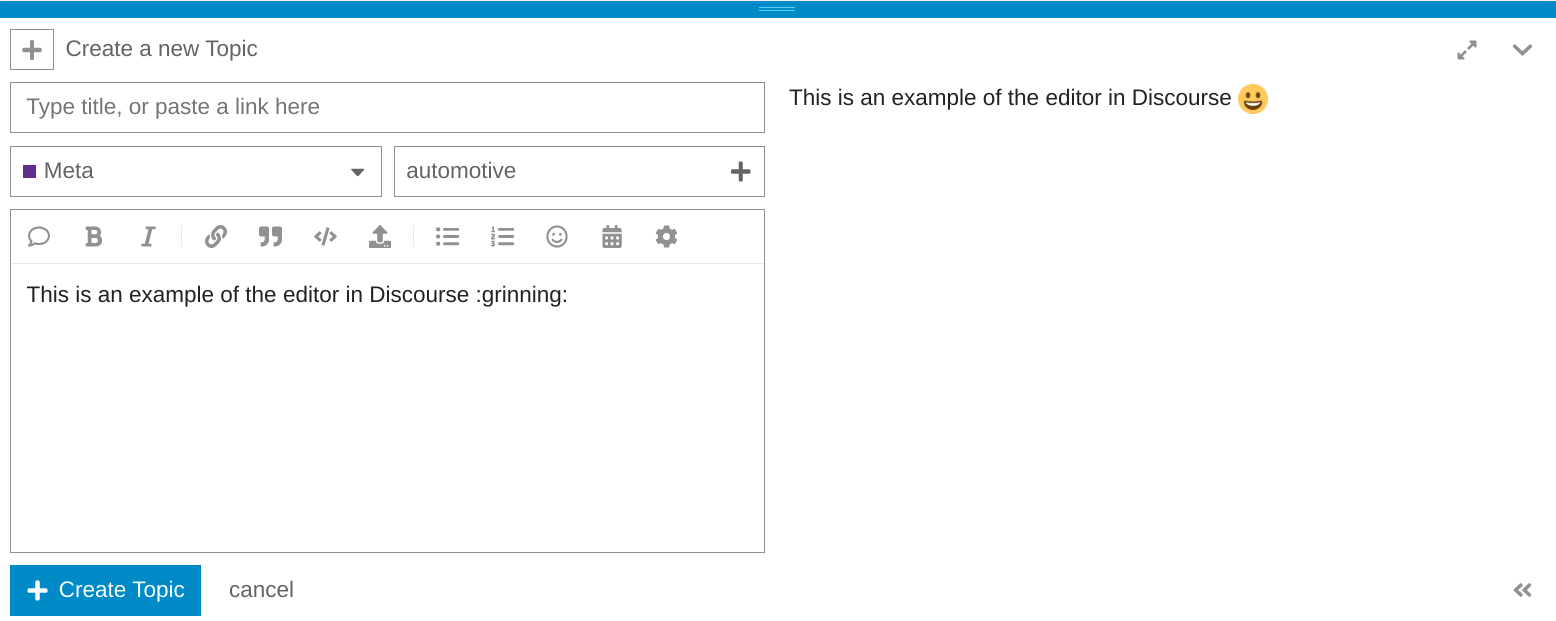
Discourse Editor (Composer)

Discourse features a rich-text editor (the "composer"). It supports plain text, markdown, and HTML. The composer features a toolbar which includes formatting, quoting, and upload buttons. The preview panel in the composer allows users to see a live preview of the post. It supports drag and drop image and file uploads. The composer supports OpenGraph and oEmbed. URLs from external websites that support those standards will automatically expand to provide a summary of the URL. One of the key features of the composer is its ability to save drafts prior to publishing them.

Certain actions in the composer are triggered based on user input. The "@" character brings up a panel for mentioning other users. The "#" character brings up a similar panel for categories and tags. The composer also features configurable JIT educational panels with the goal of promoting civilized discussion.

=== Admin interface ===
The administration dashboard's settings section allows control of appearance and behavior of the software, including fields for information about the community.

The dashboard also provides an overview of the health of the community, via charts showing signup numbers and other health metrics.

The localization section allows admins to change any text used in the interface.

=== User directory ===
The "Users" page in Discourse serves as a leader-board with search functionality. It includes statistics such as posts created, posts read, likes received, and days visited for a given time frame. Users can be sorted according to any of those metrics. Admins can optionally add more metrics.

=== Plugins ===
Discourse is extendable via plugins. Plugins create the ability to modify both the server and client sides of the application. Some examples of plugins include

- Discourse Math, which adds support for math rendering.
- Chat integrations, which integrate Discourse with popular chat platforms.
- BBCode, which adds support for BBtags.

The Discourse team maintains a list of both official and community contributed plugins on the official support forum.

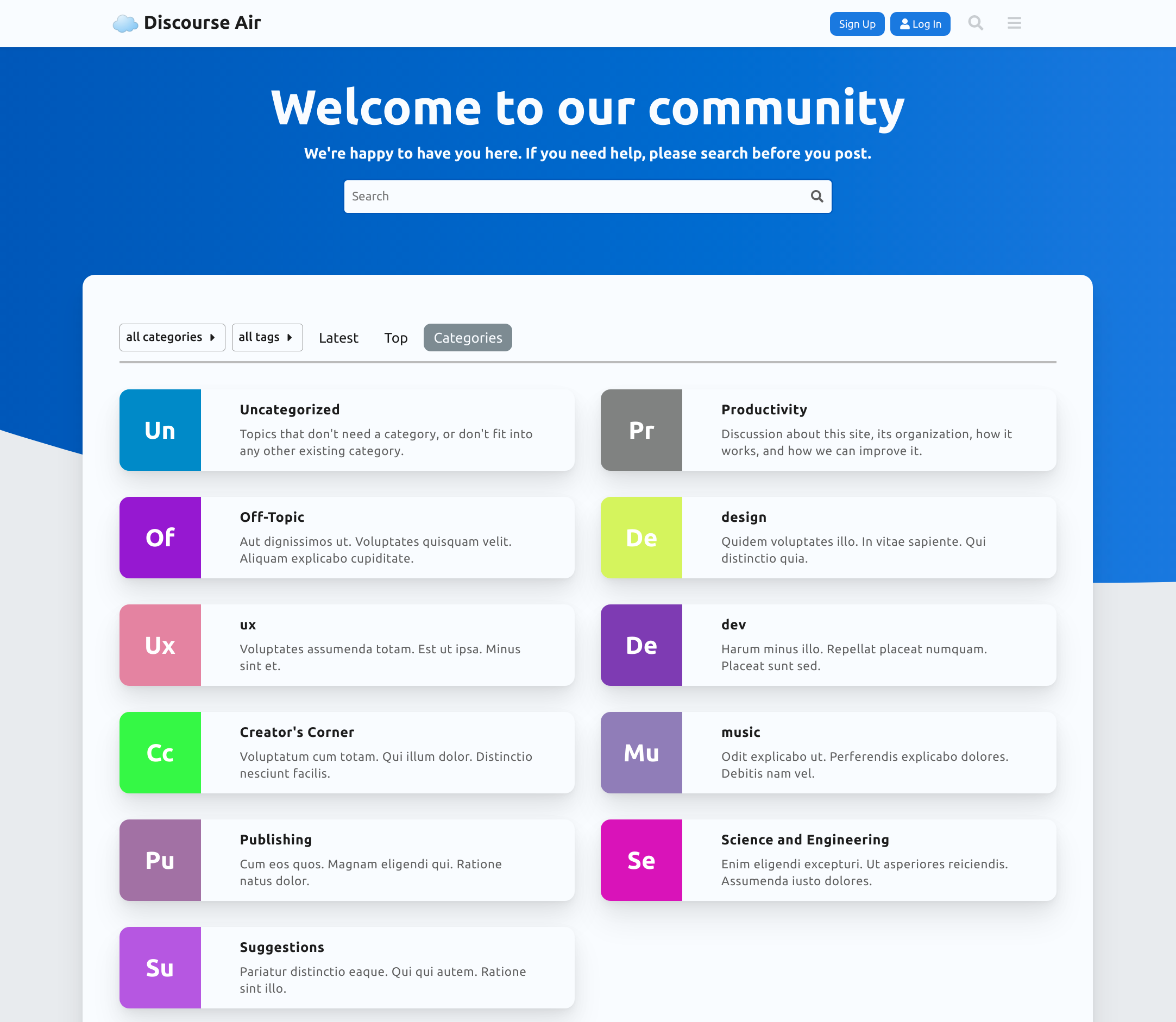
Discourse Air Theme

=== Themes ===
The Discourse theme system allows admins to customize the client side application. Themes can modify the layout of pages, add new functionality, and add additional styles to any element in the interface.

=== API ===
Discourse has a REST API. The developers maintain a getting-started guide on the support forum as well as documentation for the API endpoints.

=== Security ===
The developers welcome peer audits of the open source code and encourage reporting security issues. They maintain a vulnerability disclosure program at Hacker One.

=== DiscourseHub ===
DiscourseHub is the official, open source Discourse application for Android and iOS devices. It allows users to keep track of new and unread posts and notifications across multiple Discourse sites. Real-time push notifications are native for officially hosted Discourse forums.

== History ==
Co-founder Jeff Atwood announced in 2013 that Civilized Discourse Construction Kit, Inc. had obtained initial venture capital funding from First Round, Greylock, and SV Angel.

In May 2017, he said in an interview that the company was generating approximately $120,000 per month. With the money, the company pays salaries for its full-time employees who maintain the software and develop new features. This is an example of an open source software business model where a company sells professional services to willing customers. As of March 2022, the developers shared that more than 3000 businesses or instances have chosen the official Discourse hosting which CDCK provides as software as a service.

In August 2021, Civilized Discourse Construction Kit announced it had secured US$20 million in Series A Investment by Pace Capital and First Round Capital.

On February 1, 2023, Jeff Atwood stepped down as CEO and assumed the role of Executive Chairman. He was succeeded by Sam Saffron and Sarah Hawk.

== Development and support ==
The Discourse project is developed and maintained by the developers at Civilized Discourse Construction Kit, Inc. (CDCK).

== See also ==
- Comparison of Internet forum software
- List of blog comment hosting services
- List of mailing list software
