= Comments section =

Website feature enabling discussion of content

The comments section is a feature on most online blogs, news websites, and other websites in which the publishers invite the audience to comment on the published content. This is a continuation of the older practice of publishing letters to the editor. Despite this, comments sections can be used for more discussion between readers.

== History ==
Various methods have been used for written commentary on published works. In Germany during the 1500s it was common practice for academics to post copies of their ideas on public places, such as church doors (see for example Luther's Ninety-five Theses). Newspapers and magazines later came to publish letters to the editor. With the advent of computers, the bulletin board system allowed publication of information, and users to comment on or discuss posts.

The first online website to offer a comments section was Open Diary, which added reader comments shortly after its launch in October 1998. Readers of blog posts on the site were able to post public or private comments to the authors directly on the page. The history of comment sections on news articles started in 1998 with The Rocky Mountain News, as they were one of the first newspapers to add online comments on the same page.

While today comment sections are common, newspapers were hesitant to add them at first. In the late 2000s, comments sections were rapidly added to news sites, and between 2007 and 2008 there was a 42% growth in the number of top circulating news sites with comments sections. In 2008, 75% of the top 100 most circulated newspapers had comments sections. In 2010, The American Journalism Review stated that news sites should not have anonymous comments sections. Following that statement Reuters, ESPN, The Huffington Post, Popular Science, Sporting News, and USA Today either made comments gated or removed them. Online discourse is difficult to moderate. Harassment and negative interactions are a growing trend which has led to the closing of many comments sections.

=== Closing of comment sections ===
- Vice Media closed its comment section in 2016. On closing, they noted "we had to ban countless commenters over the years for threatening our writers and subjects, doxxing private citizens, and engaging in hate speech against pretty much every group imaginable."
- NPR closed its comment section in 2016. One of the stated reasons for this was that "commenters were behaving inappropriately and harassing other commenters".
- IMDb closed its comment section (the discussion boards, not the user reviews section) in 2017. On closing, one journalist noted that the comments section on that website was "notoriously known for hosting some of the most pointless and hateful commentary around".
- U.S.-based newspaper publisher MediaNews Group closed down the comment sections on all its news websites in July 2023, citing difficulties with moderation.

==== YouTube ====
In February 2019, YouTube began deleting and demonetizing channels and videos based on their comments section. This came after YouTuber "MattsWhatItIs" made a video exposing a ring of videos exploiting minors. He explained that videos featuring minors would have comments sections made up mostly of people making explicit and suggestive comments about those featured in the video and, in some cases, sharing links to child pornography. After advertisers began pulling ads off of the site, YouTube began deleting and demonetizing videos deemed "violating terms and services".

== Types ==
There are two types of comment sections, gated and non-gated. Gated comments sections require users to give the website some information before they can post a comment. Many news websites such as The New York Times and most social media websites are gated, as users have to log in and post under a username that identifies them. Comments sections can also be accessed in different ways, either directly attached to an article or video, or through a separate web page. Websites such as The New York Times found that user participation increased when the comments section was located directly below.

Non-gated comment sections don't require users to provide information before posting. This lack of an entry barrier can allow more people to post and potentially lead to a discussion with more viewpoints covered. This anonymity, however, is believed by some to lead to uncivil behavior and a higher likelihood of seeing or experiencing verbal aggression in the comments. In response to this, both the Illinois and New York State senates have considered bills to limit non-gated comment sections. The Illinois bill would have incentivized websites to gate their comments requiring users to provide their real name, a home address and a confirmed IP address. The New York Bill would have made websites remove anonymous commenting.

== Behavior and moderation ==
Comment sections across the internet have gained a reputation for being rude, argumentative, and being generally described as "toxic". Toxic comments refer to rude, disrespectful, or unreasonable comments that are likely to make one leave a discussion. Comments sections have been known for frequent arguing and disagreements. The reason for this may be because those with strongly-held beliefs are more likely to comment and reply to others when the comments section is widely opposed to them. Likewise, users tend to stay silent when their views are widely supported. Furthermore, thanks to the internet's principle element being the ability to stay anonymous, many people realise they can be more aggressive to others without fear of real-world accountability. In addition to this, people are more likely to comment on news articles when they are more personally affected. Participation in comments is usually low in frequency, as most will only comment on articles twice, and are more likely to comment on issues that have a determinable end.

If a comment section is moderated, it is typically done in any one of the three ways: post-moderation, pre-moderation, or through a flagging system. Comments that are post-moderated are checked after they've been posted. Pre-moderated comments are checked before they are made publicly visible. This is typically performed by an automatic filtering tool. Comments that are moderated with a flagging system can be marked, or "flagged", by other users for official website moderators to look at. In some cases, both the publishers and users can offer varying degrees of moderation in comments sections through voting systems and reporting options.

In February 2017, Google-founded technology incubator Jigsaw unveiled a tool based on artificial intelligence, called Perspective API, to identify toxic comments in online forums.

In September 2017, Disqus, a company that provides comment-hosting services, analysed over 92 million comments written by 2 million people over 16 months, on about 7,000 forums that used its service, and concluded that 25% of all commenters made at least one toxic comment. The study was carried out using Google's Perspective API. In the United States, the time of the day at which maximum proportion of comments were toxic was 3 am. However, Engadget denounced the underlying API, bringing attention to its discriminatory classifications – phrases like "I am a gay black woman" were scored as 87% toxic. It described the algorithm as "sexist, racist and ableist".

Comments sections have often been known for containing highly sexist and misogynistic statements. In a study involving feminist articles on several news websites, it was found that many were not supportive or contributing to the feminist subject. Many comments were found to be intentionally combative and considered some form of Internet trolling. Comments sections have become a modern arena for racism. Abusive language and hate speech have increased on Instagram.

Good moderation of news websites is expensive. However, most news sites do moderate. Studies of newspaper website and blog comments have shown incivility to be present in as many as 25% of comments. Most publishers and writers have been found to tolerate and accept incivility in the comments section. This is because incivility is subjective, and to remove those comments can lead to accusations of bias and unfair censorship. On the other hand, the presence of toxic comments on a news article tends to reduce the perceived credibility of the main article, which has led many news websites since 2013 to remove their comments sections.

== See also ==
- Blog comment hosting service
- Reading the Comments
