= Daniel Ha =

Co-founder and CEO of Disqus

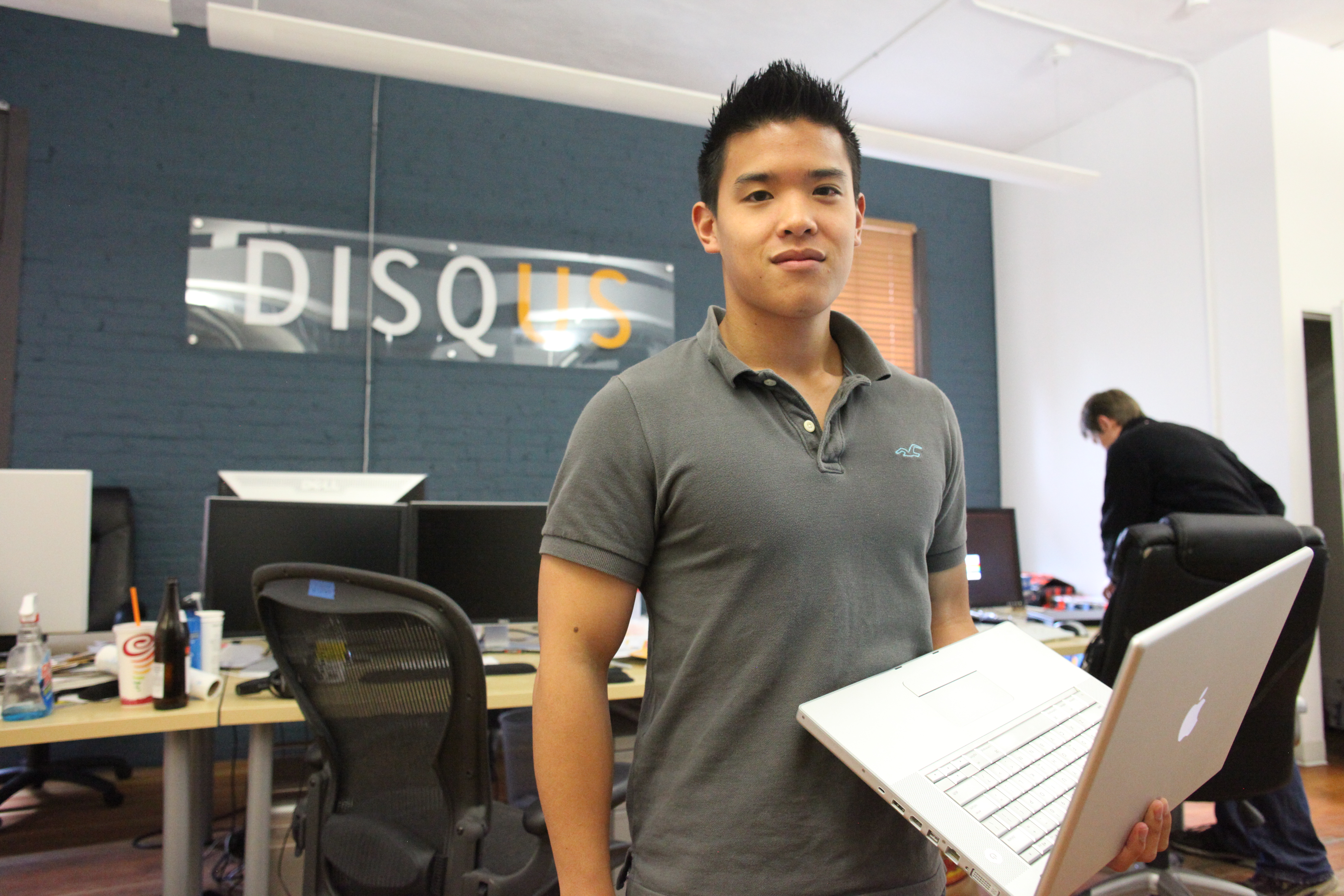
- Born: 1986 (age 39–40); Anchorage, Alaska
- Education: University of California, Davis
- Known for: Disqus

Daniel Ha is an American entrepreneur. He is the co-founder and CEO of blog comment platform Disqus.

Ha started Disqus with co-founder Jason Yan, a classmate he had known since the 7th grade, in 2007 while attending University of California, Davis to study computer engineering. After registering disqus.com as a catchy domain to be used for any number of projects that they had in mind, the project evolved from just a domain registration into a blog comment platform. Once off the ground they applied and got accepted to Y Combinator, a startup incubator, and with that footing were able to secure more meetings with investors, eventually raising $10 million in funding in May 2011. Having gone through many investor meetings, Ha found initial success.
