= Obi Worldphone =

Silicon Valley smartphone manufacturer

- Type: Private
- Industry: Telecommunications equipment
- Founded: 2014
- Founders: Neeraj Chauhan; Shane Maine; Gordon McMillan; John Sculley
- Defunct: 2018
- Headquarters: San Francisco, California, US
- Area served: Latin America; Saudi Arabia; Thailand; UAE; United Kingdom; Vietnam
- Products: Obi SF1 (2015); Obi SJ1.5 (2015); Obi MV1 (2016); Obi Lifespeed
- Owner: Etisalat
- Number of employees: 70 (2016)

Obi Worldphone, previously Obi Mobiles, was a Silicon Valley smartphone manufacturer subsidiaries of Etisalat founded in 2014 by Neeraj Chauhan, Shane Maine, Gordon McMillan, and John Sculley. Obi Worldphone manufactured smartphones aimed at the emerging markets rather than very competitive developed government.

== History ==
The company was launched as Obi Mobiles in 2014. Sculley saw a gap in the market for well-designed budget handsets and got in contact with former Director of Industrial Design, Robert Brunner (now a co-founder of Ammunition Design Group) who came up with the raised screen design found on all Obi smartphones. Ammunition subsequently designed the chassis and operating system skin the phones run on, "Obi Lifespeed".

Obi Mobiles started operations in India in July 2014. Following an unsuccessful launch, the company withdrew from India at the beginning of 2015 (with plans re-entering at the end of the year) and relaunched the brand as Obi Worldphone shortly after.

The newly branded company launched two of their pioneer low-cost smartphones on 27 August 2015. Both models were based upon Android as their operating system. Their third phone, the MV1, was announced in February 2016, and was released to Asian, African, Latin American and European markets in March 2016.

In July 2015, Obi had a 5.7% smartphone market share in the UAE, making it the company's strongest global market.

In September 2017, Sculley distanced himself from Obi and said his name was used for PR only.

== Products ==
=== SF1 ===
Launched on 27 August 2015, this phone with a raised 5-inch touchscreen display with a resolution of 1080 pixels by 1920 pixels at a PPI of 443 pixels per inch (PPI). The phone comes with a self-developed fork of the Android Operating System called "Obi Lifespeed". The device also features Dolby Audio multi-channel audio, noise cancellation, and utilizes a Qualcomm Snapdragon 615 processor, an Adreno 405 GPU, and a 3000 mAh battery. It can access 4G networks. The device comes in 32 GB + 3 GB / 16 GB + 2 GB (respectively Storage and RAM) combinations, and a choice of black or white. The initial retail price for the device is $199 and comes unlocked.

=== SJ1.5 ===
This device was launched at the same time as the SF1, and also has a 5-inch touchscreen display, however a lower resolution, lack of 4G, and lack of some luxuries lends this phone a cheaper $129 retail price. The device is all plastics in a range of colors and comes with 16 GB of storage and a 3,000 milliamps battery. Both the SF1 and SJ1.5 feature a dual SIM tray.

=== MV1 ===
The MV1 has a 5-inch Gorilla Glass 3 display with 1280 × 720 (HD) resolution; it runs on a Qualcomm Snapdragon 212 processor, 2 GB of RAM, and 16 GB of storage. It features a dual SIM tray.

== Awards ==
In 2015, Obi Worldphone's SF1 was voted the fifth-best smartphone available in Vietnam in VNExpress' "TechAwards 2015" (Sản phẩm Công nghệ xuất sắc 2015).

== See also ==
- List of mobile phone makers by country
