= Cyberposium =

Cyberposium 15

HBS Tech Conference (formerly named "Cyberposium") is the largest MBA technology and media conference in the world. Held at Harvard Business School since 1992, the conference draws some 1,300 attendees from the tech industry as well as from the VC and startup communities. Held on the campus of HBS, the Tech Conference is the primary campus event of Harvard Business School's Tech Club.

The 2017 conference was held on September 16, 2017, on the school's campus in Boston.

== History ==
Year	Theme	Keynote Speaker(s)
1992/1993	Harvard/MIT Communications 2000 Symposium at the Harvard Business School: The Dawn of a $3.5 Trillion Communications Mega-Industry - Information Access, Processing and Distribution in a Digital World	John Sculley (Apple Computer)
1995/6	Interactive Media, Internet, and Communications	
1996/7	Digital Field of Dreams	John Sculley (Apple Computer) Halsey Minor (CNET)
1997/8	The Net Effect	Jerry Yang (Yahoo!) Eric Hippeau (Ziff Davis)
1998/9	Net-working	Carly Fiorina (Lucent) Guy Kawasaki (garage.com) Bob Lessin (WIT Capital)
1999/2000	Leading the Digital Millennium	Jeff Bezos (Amazon.com) Dave Wetherell (CMGI)
2000/1	David, Goliath, and Disruption	Tim Koogle (Yahoo!) Hank Barry (Napster) Jim Barksdale (Netscape)
2001/2	High-tech Balancing Act	Thomas Siebel (Siebel Systems) Dean Kamen (Segway)
2002/3	Finding Hope in the Tech Rubble	Russell Simmons (Def Jam) Eric Janszen (BlueSocket)
2003/4	Harnessing Technology's Promise	Tony Scott (General Motors) Eric B. Kim (Samsung) Linda Sanford (IBM)
2004/5	Realizing the Value of Convergence	F. Thomson Leighton (Akamai) Fred Weber (AMD)
2005/6	Techknowledge for Tomorrow	Jim Balsillie (Research In Motion) Geoffrey Moore (Author) Elon Musk (SpaceX)
2006/7	Need Directions? Mapping Future Technology	Marissa Mayer (Google) Ed Colligan (Palm) Steve Papa (Endeca)
2007/8	Innovation without Borders	Ray Kurzweil Philip Rosedale (Linden Lab) Walt Mossberg (The Wall Street Journal)
2008/9	Emerging and Converging	Craig Newmark (Craigslist) Mark Jannot (Popular Science)
2010/11	Battle of the Platforms	Joe Kennedy (Pandora) Peter Chou (HTC)
2011/12	Sky's the Limit?	Brad Smith (Intuit) Jack Trenton (Sony) Katie Mitic (Facebook)
2012/13	The Battle for Access	Drew Houston (Dropbox) Lee Hower (LinkedIn) Alexa Hirschfeld (Paperless Post)
2013/14	Techonomy 2.0	Travis Kalanick (Uber) Rich Miner (Google Ventures) Bill Clerico (WePay)
2014/15	Future Within Focus	Sam Altman (YCombinator) Matt Wallach (Veeva Systems) Jennifer Fleiss (Rent the Runway) Zach Nelson and Evan Goldberg (NetSuite) Chris Hulls (Life360)
2015/2016		
2016/2017	Hello World	Brendan Iribe (Oculus VR) Max Levchin (PayPal) Apoorva Mehta (Instacart)
2017/2018	The Future We're Building	Bozoma Saint John (Uber) Deep Nishar (SoftBank) Carolyn Everson (Facebook)
