= Hitbox (web analytics) =

Hitbox was a popular web counter and web analytics product created by WebSideStory, until taken over by Omniture (subsequently taken over by Adobe), originally for adult entertainment websites. It was widely used by commercial & other organizations across a variety of industrial sectors as a complete and integrated metrics solution for monitoring web traffic and driving marketing. Adobe plans to completely phase it out by moving all their clients to their flagship product, SiteCatalyst.

Companies place JavaScript files on their web servers which are linked to from a HTML script in the page code. The combination of the two makes a request from the data collection servers for each page viewed by a user. A cookie is placed on the users computer which contains a unique id. This unique id is passed with the request to the data collection servers. During the processing of the data Hitbox ties together the page views to get a perspective of how the user moved through the site. Other, custom information can be passed in the request as well as information from the HTTP header of the browser, such as referrer and browser details.

Some Web Analytics services have been declared spyware by several anti-spyware organizations.
