= David A. Steinberg =

Founder of Zeta Global

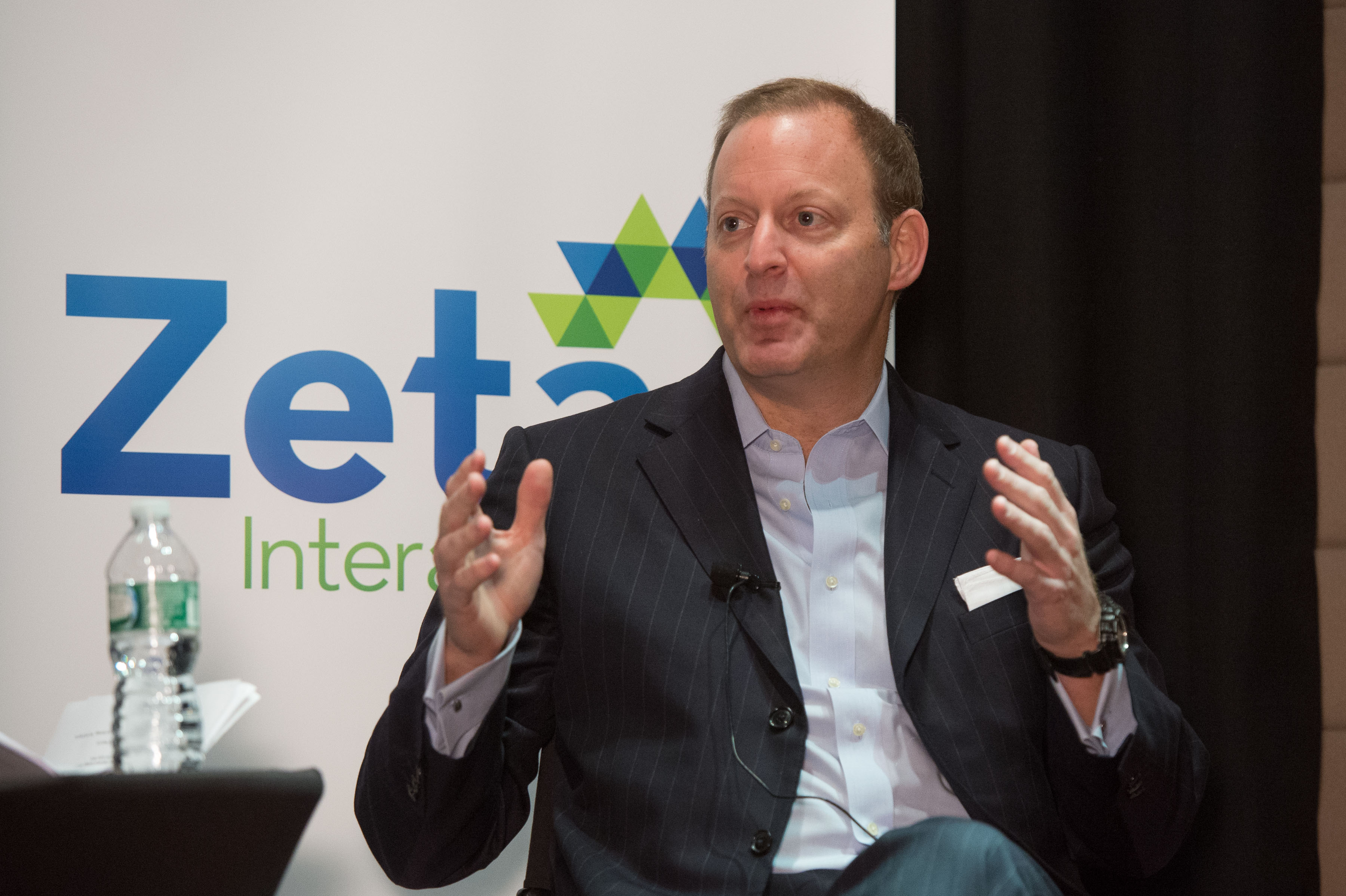
- Born: 1969 (age 56–57)
- Occupations: Founder and CEO of Zeta Global, former CEO InPhonic
- Known for: Serial entrepreneur

David A. Steinberg (born 1969) is an American serial entrepreneur. He is the founder and chief executive officer of Zeta Global. Steinberg also serves as chairman and co-founder of On Demand Pharma and Caivis Investment Corporation.

== Career ==
In 1993, David Steinberg founded Sterling Cellular, Inc. in the basement of his house in Bethesda, Maryland, with the use of credit cards and a parental loan. Sterling Cellular sold cellular phones and grossed $1.3 million in sales in its first year in business. Sterling offered free, timed delivery, a warranty/repair program, and a free loaner phone program from its third month. By 1997, Sterling Cellular grew to 12 retail locations and $22 million in sales.

In 1999, Steinberg broke up Sterling Cellular by selling off the retail chain and telemarketing operations of Sterling Cellular and founding Inphonic. Over a seven-year period, Inphonic grew into the largest seller of new cell phones on the internet with over $300 million in revenue. As the public face for Inphonic, he was praised for creating and growing the online business that dominates online sales for cell phones.

When the 2008 financial crisis began, Inphonic suffered. In November 2007, after Steinberg resigned as CEO and chairman of the board, InPhonic filed a Chapter 11 petition in the United States Bankruptcy Court for the District of Delaware. In December, InPhonic was acquired by Versa Capital Management and relaunched as Simplexity.

After Inphonic, Steinberg secured support to start a new corporation, CAIVIS Acquisition Corp, an investment firm that invests in startup technology and marketing companies.

In 2011, Steinberg started XL Marketing Corp with John Sculley, the company is today known as Zeta Global.

== Zeta Global ==
Zeta Global, (formerly Zeta Interactive) was originally built through several small companies specializing in different facets of online marketing and CRM that were acquired and combined to create the firm which has now grown into a full-service big data, customer acquisition, and customer relationship management services. Originally called, XL Marketing in June 2012 it raised capital of $70 million. It acquired rival Intela and the Adchemy Actions division with that $70 million. In July 2015, the company raised $125 million from Blackstone's GSO Capital Partners to grow its business through acquisitions of large data and AI companies. The company has been listed by Forbes Magazine as one of America's 50 Most Promising Private Companies and referred to as a 'Unicorn,' a "billion-dollar startup".

Zeta calls its approach to data-driven marketing "precision marketing". Again in 2015, Steinberg helmed Zeta Global as it acquired the customer relationship management division of eBay's Enterprise operation, in a deal that sources near the company said was worth US$80–90 million. Steinberg said Zeta is finally on its way to becoming “the largest customer lifecycle management platform." In April 2017, Steinberg continued building Zeta Global with a $140 million fundraise with funds coming from GPI Capital and Franklin Square Capital Partners. Forbes reported that sources are valuing the company at close to $1.3 billion. Steinberg said the company is considering an IPO. Zeta doesn't sell its data to marketers or other outside companies but uses it to develop its consumer insights. Data is effectively the electricity that powers their technology platform. Zeta Global has the industry's third largest data set (2.4B+ identities), next to Google and Facebook, powered by demographic, locational, behavioral, transactional, and predictive signals. Zeta Global announced on March 1, 2021, that the company had raised $222.5 Million in their most recent debt financing funding round. Investors in this latest funding round included lead investor BofA Securities with Credit Suisse, Morgan Stanley, and Barclays.

Zeta Global went public on the New York Stock exchange on June 10, 2021.

== Personal ==
Steinberg is married and has four children. He has served on the Washington & Jefferson College Board of Trustees.
