= John Sculley =

American businessman (born 1939)

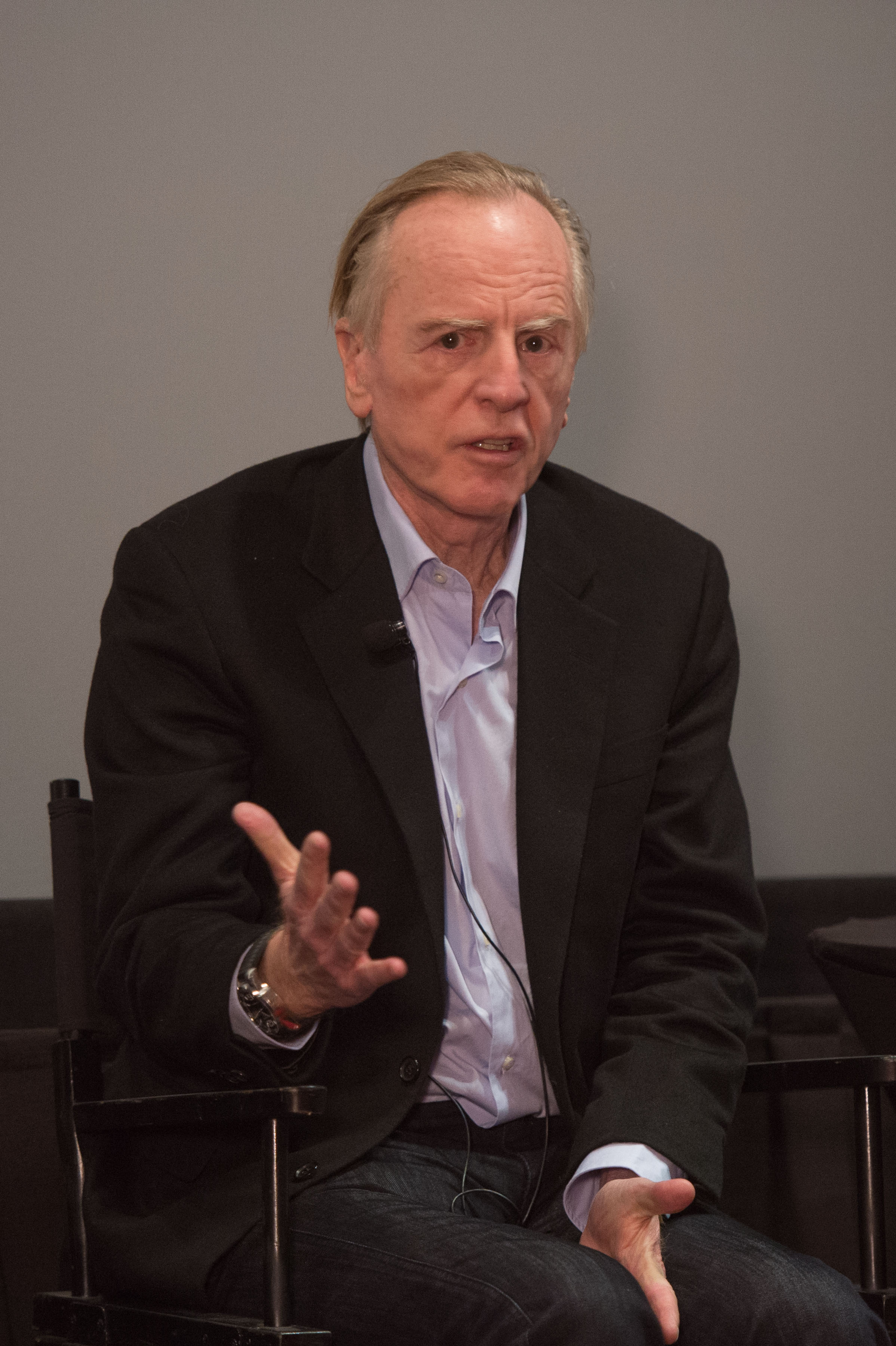
- Sculley in January 2014
- Born: John Sculley III; April 6, 1939 (age 87); New York City, New York, U.S.
- Education: Brown University; University of Pennsylvania
- Occupations: Vice President and President at PepsiCo (1970-1983); Chief executive officer of Apple (1983–1993); Partner at Sculley Brothers LLC (1995–2005); Founder Obi Worldphone (2014–2018); Co-Founder Zeta Global (2007–present)
- Spouses: Ruth Sculley (m. 1960; div. 1965) "Leezy" Sculley née Carol Lee Adams (m. 1978; div. 2011) Diane Sculley (m. 2013)
- Children: 2

John Sculley III (born April 6, 1939) is an American businessman, entrepreneur, and investor in high-tech startups. Sculley was vice-president (1970–1977) and president of PepsiCo (1977–1983), until he became chief executive officer (CEO) of Apple in April 1983, a position he held until October 1993. In 1987, Sculley was named Silicon Valley's top-paid executive, with an annual salary of US$10.2 million.

During Sculley's tenure at Apple, the company's sales increased tenfold from $800 million to $8 billion, while the period between 1989 and 1991 was regarded as the "first golden age" of Macintosh. Some attribute his success to the fact that he joined the company just when co-founders Steve Jobs's visions and Steve Wozniak's creations had become highly lucrative. Jobs and Sculley "clashed over management styles and priorities, Jobs focusing on future innovation and Sculley more on current product lines and profitability". Sculley won a power struggle leading to Jobs's ousting, and departed from Jobs's sales structure, instead deciding to compete with IBM in selling computers to the same types of customers. This strategy was initially successful due to the launch of fresh new Macintosh models for different segments which generated increasing profits. By the early 1990s, profits declined due to increasing competition from less expensive IBM PC compatibles running Windows 3.0. Sculley was ultimately forced to step down as Apple CEO because he was opposed to licensing Macintosh software and was talking to Goldman Sachs about splitting Apple into two companies. When Sculley left in May 1993, Apple had $2 billion in cash and $200 million in debt.

Sculley is recognized as an expert in marketing, in part because of his early successes at PepsiCo, notably his introduction of the Pepsi Challenge, which allowed the company to gain market share from primary rival Coca-Cola. He used similar marketing strategies throughout the 1980s and 1990s at Apple to mass-market Macintosh personal computers, and today he continues to speak and write about disruptive marketing strategies. Sculley has invested in and has been involved with a number of high-tech start-up companies, (Note: Including 3CInteractive, Zeta Global, Inflexion Point, Mobeam, OpenPeak, x10 Credit, Pivot Acquisition Corp., nextSource and WorldMate) and as of 2016 served as Chairman of the PeopleTicker and SkillsVillage.

== Early life ==
Sculley was born in New York City, the son of Margaret Blackburn (Smith), a horticulturist, and John Sculley Jr., a Wall Street lawyer. Sculley and his brothers spent much of their childhood in Bermuda before moving back to New York. He attended high school at St. Mark's School in Southborough, Massachusetts.

Sculley received a bachelor's degree in architectural design from Brown University and an MBA from the Wharton School of the University of Pennsylvania.

== Career ==
Sculley began work at Marschalk Co. in New York City in 1963.

=== 1967–82: Pepsi-Cola ===
Sculley joined the Pepsi-Cola division of PepsiCo in 1967 as a trainee, where he participated in a six-month training program at a bottling plant in Pittsburgh. In 1970, at the age of 30, Sculley became the company's youngest marketing vice-president.

Sculley initiated one of the company's first consumer-research studies, an extended in-home product test in which 350 families participated. As a result of the research, Pepsi decided to launch new, larger, and more varied packages of their soft drinks, including the two-liter bottle Sculley worked with DuPont to develop. In 1970, Pepsi set out to dethrone Coca-Cola as the market leader of the industry, in what eventually became known as the Cola Wars. Pepsi began spending more on marketing and advertising, typically paying between $200,000 and $300,000 for each television spot, while most companies spent between $15,000 and $75,000. With the Pepsi Generation campaign, Pepsi aimed to overturn Coca-Cola's classic marketing.

In 1974, Sculley became president of PepsiCo's International Food Operations division, shortly after he visited a failing potato-chip factory in Paris. PepsiCo's food division was their only money-losing division, with revenues of $83 million and losses of $156.5 million. To make the food division profitable, Sculley improved product quality, enhanced accounts, and established financial controls. Within three years, the food division was making $300 million in revenues and $40 million in profit.

Sculley was best known at Pepsi for the Pepsi Challenge, an advertising campaign he started in 1975 to compete against Coca-Cola to gain market share, using heavily advertised taste tests. It claimed based on Sculley's own research that Pepsi-Cola tasted better than Coca-Cola. The Pepsi Challenge included a series of television advertisements that first aired in the early 1970s, featuring lifelong Coca-Cola drinkers participating in blind taste tests. Pepsi's soft drink was always chosen as the preferred product by the participant; however, these results have been criticized as being caused by Pepsi's sweetness, rather than its superior taste.

The Pepsi Challenge was mostly targeted at the Texas market, where Pepsi had a significantly lower market share at the time. The campaign was successful, significantly increasing Pepsi's market share in that state. At the time the Pepsi Challenge was started, Sculley was senior vice president of United States sales and marketing operations at Pepsi. Sculley himself took the taste test and picked Coke instead of Pepsi.

In 1977, Sculley was named Pepsi's youngest-ever president. Although commonly called the CEO of Pepsi, this was never the case. At the time of his departure, Don Kendall was CEO of Pepsi.

=== 1983–93: Apple Computer, Inc. ===
I think of you just like Woz and Markkula. You're like one of the founders of the company. They founded the company, but you and I are founding the future.

— Steve Jobs, to John Sculley, at the Macintosh introduction rehearsal in 1984

Apple lured Sculley away from Pepsi in order to apply his marketing skills to the personal computer market. Steve Jobs successfully sealed the deal after he made his pitch to Sculley: "Do you want to sell sugared water for the rest of your life? Or do you want to come with me and change the world?" Apple's president, Mike Markkula, wanted to retire and believed that Jobs, who wished to be the company's president, lacked the discipline and temperament needed to run Apple on a daily basis. Sculley, with his solid business background and recent success, would give Apple an image of greater reliability and stability. In an interview with Authority Magazine, Sculley said that Jobs came to him and said "How did you do that? You had no money to speak of at Pepsi. "How did you pass Coca Cola?" And I responded, "Well, we call it experience marketing." The focus was on selling the experience, not the product.

When Sculley started at Apple, he got a $1 million signing bonus, $1 million in annual pay and options on 350,000 Apple shares. From the time Jobs and Sculley first met in 1982 until 1985, they had what they both acknowledged as an "amazing" partnership. Sculley used his marketing experience to help keep the aging Apple II, generating much-needed cash, and helped Jobs launch the Mac with the most admired consumer marketing campaign of its time. Once Jobs took over the Macintosh project from Apple co-founder Steve Wozniak and early Apple employee Jef Raskin, he became the executive product manager and made all the product decisions.

The Lisa computer, an innovative model designed by a team initially led by Jobs, became available in January 1983, and had disastrous sales. When Jobs's Macintosh, the first of a new series of models with a pioneering black-and-white graphical user interface, was shipped to stores in January 1984, Sculley raised the initial price to $2,495 from the originally planned $1,995, allocating the additional money to hypothetically higher profit margins and to expensive advertising campaigns. Macintosh sold well and received excellent reviews, but it did not eliminate the IBM PC.

At the peak of the Macintosh success, Apple made an attempt to move unsold inventory of Lisa computers by renaming it to "Macintosh XL" and positioning it as a top-of-the-line pro Macintosh model. At this point, a power struggle between Jobs and Sculley was becoming obvious. Jobs became "non-linear": he kept meetings running past midnight, sent out lengthy faxes, then called new meetings at 7:00 am. Sculley had little control over the Macintosh division where Jobs was the general manager.

The Apple board of directors instructed Sculley to "contain" Jobs and limit his ability to launch expensive forays into untested products. Rather than submit to Sculley's direction, Jobs attempted to oust him from his leadership role at Apple. Sculley found out about Jobs's plans and called a board meeting at which Apple's board of directors sided with Sculley and removed Jobs from his managerial duties. Jobs resigned from Apple and founded NeXT Inc. the same year. Sculley said in 2015 that Jobs never forgave him and their friendship was never repaired.

After Jobs left, Sculley was named president and the company experienced a turnaround in 1986; one journalist wrote "since Sculley joined the company … many things have changed", and that his "strategy has worked". Wozniak credited the Macintosh's initial success to Sculley, saying that he "worked to build a Macintosh market when the Apple II went away". Under the direction of Sculley, who had learned several painful lessons after introducing the bulky Macintosh Portable in 1989, Apple introduced the PowerBook in 1991.

In 1991, Apple introduced System 7, a major upgrade to the operating system, which added color to the interface and introduced new networking capabilities. It remained the architectural basis for Mac OS until 2001, when the classic Mac OS was replaced by Mac OS X. The success of the PowerBook and other products brought increasing revenue with the company introducing new products and increasing profits in the process. The magazine MacAddict named the period between 1989 and 1991 as the "first golden age" of the Macintosh. Under the leadership of Sculley, Apple's sales grew from $982 million in 1983 to $7.9 billion in 1993.

Microsoft threatened to discontinue Microsoft Office for the Macintosh if Apple did not license parts of the Macintosh graphical user interface to use in the Windows operating system. Under pressure, Sculley agreed, a decision which later affected the Apple v. Microsoft lawsuit. About that time, Sculley coined the term personal digital assistant (PDA) referring to the Apple Newton, one of the world's first PDAs, a product that Sculley oversaw and launched in 1993.

In 1987, Sculley made several predictions in a Playboy interview: He predicted that the Soviet Union would land a man on Mars within the next 20 years and he claimed that optical storage media such as the CD-ROM would revolutionize the use of personal computers. Some of his ideas for the Knowledge Navigator were eventually fulfilled by the Internet and the World Wide Web during the 1990s and others by Apple itself with the introduction of Siri.

On December 5, 1992, Sculley gave a seminal speech regarding the future of the Internet, titled "The Dawn of a $3.5 Trillion Communications Mega-Industry: Information Access, Processing and Distribution in a Digital World." This was the keynote address to a packed house at the Harvard Business School's Burden Auditorium, as part of the inaugural student-run Harvard/MIT Communications 2000 Symposium, now known as the Harvard Business School Tech Club's annual Cyberposium.

In the early 1990s, Sculley led Apple to port its operating system to run on a new microprocessor, the PowerPC. Sculley later acknowledged this was his greatest mistake, indicating that he should instead have targeted the dominant Intel architecture. By 1993 Sculley was reportedly focused on Newton and disinterested in the rest of the company. After a bad first quarter in 1993, amid a personal computer price war and internal tension over the company's direction, Apple's board forced Sculley out. He resigned on October 15, 1993 and was replaced by German-born Michael Spindler, who had been Chief Operating Officer. Spindler was ousted three years later and replaced with Gil Amelio. In 1997, amidst poor financial performance Apple would acquire Steve Jobs's NeXT Software; Jobs would oust Amelio and reinstate himself as chief executive.

=== 1993–present: tech investment ===
After leaving Apple in 1993, Sculley became chairman and chief executive officer at Spectrum Information Technologies, a New York-based company that held key computer patents for wireless data transmission. Only four months later he resigned from the company and filed a lawsuit against Spectrum president Peter Caserta, seeking more than $10 million in damages. Sculley alleged that he was misled when he was hired at Spectrum by not being told of SEC inquiries and "aggressive revenue recognition accounting" for license fees.

Sculley was a founding investor in MetroPCS (formerly General Wireless) and helped guide the company's brand marketing; MetroPCS became a multibillion-dollar public company on the New York Stock Exchange until its acquisition by T-Mobile in 2013. He built NFO Research from $25 million to $550 million in revenue, and sold it to IPG for $850 million. He helped launch and advised Hotwire.com, IntraLinks (which was co-founded by his brother Arthur), and InPhonic, Buy.com, and PeoplePC.

In 1997, Sculley became the chairman of Live Picture, a California-based company, to oversee its push into high-quality, low-bandwidth imaging over the Internet. $22M in venture capital was provided for the company. Sculley later left the company but remained an investor. In 1999, Live Picture filed for bankruptcy protection as part of a plan to be acquired by MGI Software.

In 1997, Sculley co-founded PopTech with Bob Metcalfe and several other dignitaries from the technology industry. In 1998, he joined the board of directors of BuyComp LLC (now Buy.com), an Internet-only computer store. Two years later, he partnered with Dennis M. Lynch to launch Signature21, providing marketing services to small to medium-sized businesses. In 2001, Sculley and Lynch transitioned the company into a learning program for rising entrepreneurs. Months later, Lynch left the company, while Sculley continued to consult and work with small businesses, including InPhonic, whose board of directors he later joined. InPhonic was an online retailer of cell phones and wireless plans. Sculley's early leadership helped steer InPhonic towards its successful IPO in 2004. Sculley served as the vice chairman of the InPhonic board of directors. InPhonic filed for bankruptcy in 2007.

In 2002, Sculley endorsed and invested in the Wine Clip, a wine accessory product, which claimed to accelerate the aeration of wine by exposure to magnets. A year later he helped in the founding of Verified Person Inc., an online pre-employment screening company. As of 2012, he served on the board of directors. In 2004, Sculley joined the board of directors at OpenPeak, a maker of software for wireless consumer electronics, digital media, computers, and home systems. In the same year, Sculley became a venture partner at Rho Ventures. In March 2006, Sculley was named Chairman of IdenTrust (formerly Digital Signature Trust Company) a San Francisco-based firm focusing on verifying identity and boosting financial security.

Before speaking at the Silicon Valley 4.0 conference, Sculley was interviewed by CNET in October 2003, where he explained the mistakes he made at Apple concerning the Apple Newton and HyperCard. Sculley had canceled Apple's first hand-held mobile tablet PenMac led by Paul Mercer with applications by Samir Arora and instead signed an agreement to work with Sharp Electronics on the Newton technology. Also in 2003, Sculley was interviewed by the BBC for the television documentary The World's Most Powerful episode "Steve Jobs vs. Bill Gates", discussing his time at Apple during the 1980s as CEO. In 2010, he was interviewed for Cult of Mac on the topics of Steve Jobs and design.

In 2007, Sculley co-founded the data company Zeta Global with business partner David A. Steinberg, and in January 2014 the data analytics firm XL Marketing, rebranded and incorporated its resources into Zeta Interactive, re-launching it as a Big Data-Driven Marketing firm. On January 30, 2014, Sculley was a panelist at a forum organized by Zeta, which featured ad executives, marketers and NFL executive to discuss the changes in the way companies market and reach consumers since Sculley's time at Apple in 1984 when the computer company featured what became one of the first iconic Super Bowl ads—the 1984 commercial. In October 2016, Zeta Interactive was again rebranded as Zeta Global. Sculley retired from Zeta Global's board in June 2025.

In 2014, Sculley co-founded Obi Mobiles, a smartphone brand aimed at the emerging markets. The company was renamed Obi Worldphone. In September 2017, Sculley distanced himself from Obi Worldphone and told that his name was used for PR only. He has also been working in the health care industry, focusing on RxAdvance, a cloud-based platform that helps pharmaceutical companies, hospitals and insurers manage chronically ill patients living at home.

== Political activity ==
Sculley went political in the early 1990s on behalf of Republican Tom Campbell, who in 1992 was running in the California Republican primary to be the party candidate for a United States Senate seat. Sculley hosted a fundraiser for Campbell at his ranch in Woodside. Sculley had become acquainted with Hillary Clinton, serving with her on a national education council. When Bill Clinton ran for president, Sculley supported him. Sculley sat next to Hillary Clinton during the President's first State of the Union address in January 1993.

== Personal life ==
Sculley married Ruth, stepdaughter of PepsiCo president Donald Kendall in 1960, with whom he had two children. The couple divorced in 1965. In 1978, he married Carol Lee Adams, ex-wife of a former PepsiCo vice president, ultimately divorcing in 2011.

In 2013, Sculley married Diane Gibbs Poli, vice president and design coordinator for Wittman Building Corporation, and they live in Palm Beach, Florida.

Sculley was portrayed by Allan Royal in the 1999 TNT television film Pirates of Silicon Valley, by Matthew Modine in the 2013 film Jobs and by Jeff Daniels in the 2015 film Steve Jobs.

In 2016, while visiting Japan, Sculley saw Steve Jobs's autograph in a sushi restaurant, and broke down in tears. The owner said:

“He told me that since they were retired from the frontlines of business, they could have enjoyed sushi at Steve’s favorite restaurant and had a good time together, but he has passed away and now he’s in heaven.”

== Notes ==
Business positions
Preceded by Mike Markkula	Apple CEO; 1983–1993	Succeeded by Michael Spindler
Preceded by Mike Markkula	Apple Chairman; 1993	Succeeded by Mike Markkula
