= Blog comment hosting service =

A blog comment hosting service is a service which externally hosts comments posted by users to blog or online newspaper posts. Many such services allow for users to log into a blog comment hosting service using social network profile credentials such as those of Facebook Connect, Yahoo!, Google, LinkedIn, Myspace, etc. Such services may also have an effect upon instances of comment spam, as prior registration with comment hosts may be the only means by which to make comments onto many blogs.

== Comparison of blog comment hosting services ==
Service	Date Founded	Active	Free	Advertisements	Real Time Comments	Media Support	Additional Languages	Self Hosted
Discourse	2013	Yes	Yes	No	Yes	Yes	No	Yes
Disqus	2007	Yes	Yes	Yes	Yes	Yes	Yes	No
Echo	2002	?	?	?	?	?	?	?
IntenseDebate	2007	Yes	Yes	No	Yes	Yes	No	No
Livefyre	2009	No	Yes	No	Yes	Yes	Yes	No
VK	?	Yes	Yes	?	?	?	?	No
Facebook	?	Yes	Yes	?	?	?	?	No
