= Echo (blog comment hosting service) =

Echo was a blog comment hosting service.

== History ==
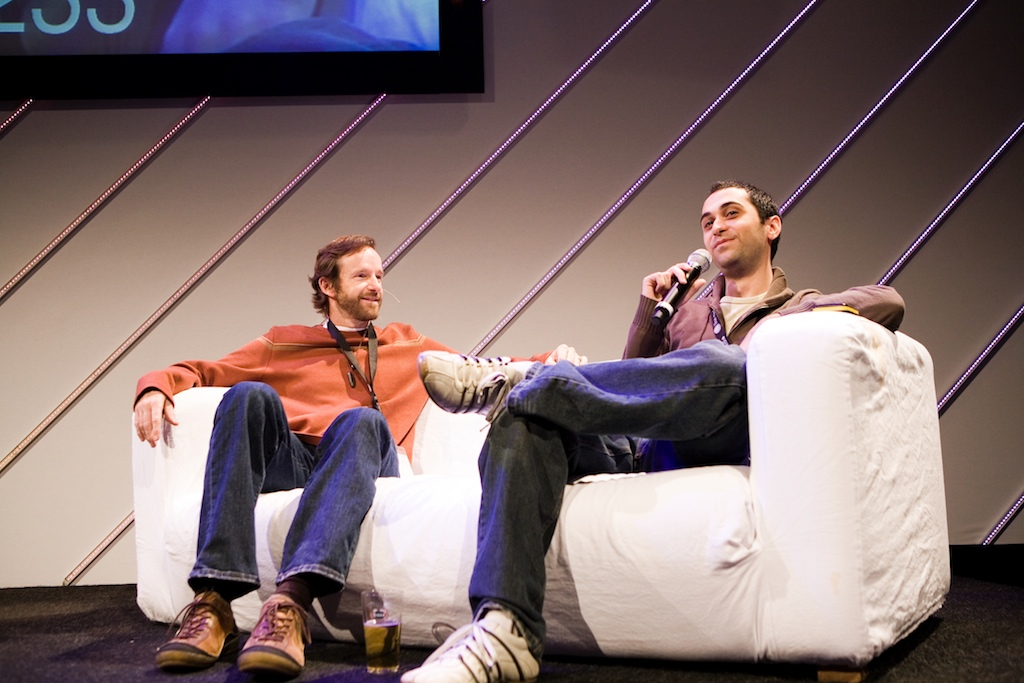
Khris Loux and Chris Saad at TNW Conference 2008

JS-Kit was started as a side project of Russian-born programmer and Cisco Security Engineer Lev Walkin, who released JS-Kit as a quickly-embeddable comment system for blogs in 2006. The venture grew into a full-on hosting service for comments, with Walkin becoming CTO, Khris Loux becoming CEO and Chris Saad becoming Chief Strategy Officer. As company and its product evolved, JS-Kit was rebranded as Echo in 2009.

== Haloscan acquisition ==
Haloscan was one of the first third-party blog comment hosting services, established in 2002. Haloscan was acquired by JS-Kit in 2008. In 2009, Echo had requested users of Haloscan product to upgrade to its core service.

In 2012, it was announced that Echo would discontinue their comment hosting-exclusive services in favor of social media applications (i.e., USA Network's "Character Chatter" website feature, among other feedback features), with support for all remaining JS-Kit, Haloscan and Echo comment modules being withdrawn.

== Other acquisitions ==
- SezWho (2009)
