= Josh James =

American entrepreneur (born 1973)

- Born: June 28, 1973 (age 53)
- Education: Brigham Young University
- Years active: 1996–present
- Known for: Domo founder and CEO; Omniture co-founder and CEO
- Spouse(s): Marina Bardin James (married Sept 2017); Cherie James (div. 2014)
- Website: www.joshjames.com

Josh James is an American entrepreneur, founder and former CEO of Domo, a software-as-a-service (SaaS) company. He was co-founder and CEO of Omniture, a web analytics company.

== Career ==
James attended Brigham Young University into his senior year, but did not graduate. Before co-founding Omniture, James co-founded an interactive agency and two other businesses, which were subsequently sold to WebMediaBrands (formerly known as Jupitermedia) and Verisign. James founded Silicon Slopes, a private-sector initiative that promotes the interests of the high-tech industry in Utah. James took Omniture public on the Nasdaq in 2006. In 2009 he sold the company to Adobe for US$1.8 billion. From 2006 to 2009 – the three years that Omniture was public – James was the youngest CEO of a Nasdaq or New York Stock Exchange-traded company. James rang the bell of the Nasdaq as Domo went public in 2018. He sits on the Parity.org Board of Advisors.

== Honors and awards ==
In 2017 and 2018 his company, Domo, landed on the Inc. 5000 and Deloitte Technology Fast 500 lists of the fastest growing companies in North America. In 2018, Domo was named a Best Companies to Work For by Utah Business Magazine for the 7th consecutive year. James was named to Utah Valley BusinessQ's Hall of Fame. In 2017, his company was named a CNBC Disruptor 50 and in 2015, it was named a World Economic Forum Tech Pioneer. In 2012, Mountain West Capital Network named James Entrepreneur of the Year. On June 27, 2012, James and Domo, Inc. received the Utah Valley Business Q "2012 UV50 TOP 10 Startups To Watch" award. James was featured as #26 on Fortune 40 under 40 in 2009 and #1 on Fortune 40 under 40 "Ones to Watch" in 2011. He received the 2006 Ernst & Young Entrepreneur of the Year Award and was named Technology Entrepreneur of the Decade by Brigham Young University. On November 30, 2012, James was inducted into the Utah Technology Hall of Fame.

== Personal ==
James had roles as a child actor, which included appearing in episodes of Touched by an Angel and in a Kellogg's Honey Smacks breakfast cereal commercial.
