= OCR Systems =

American computing company

OCR Systems, Inc.

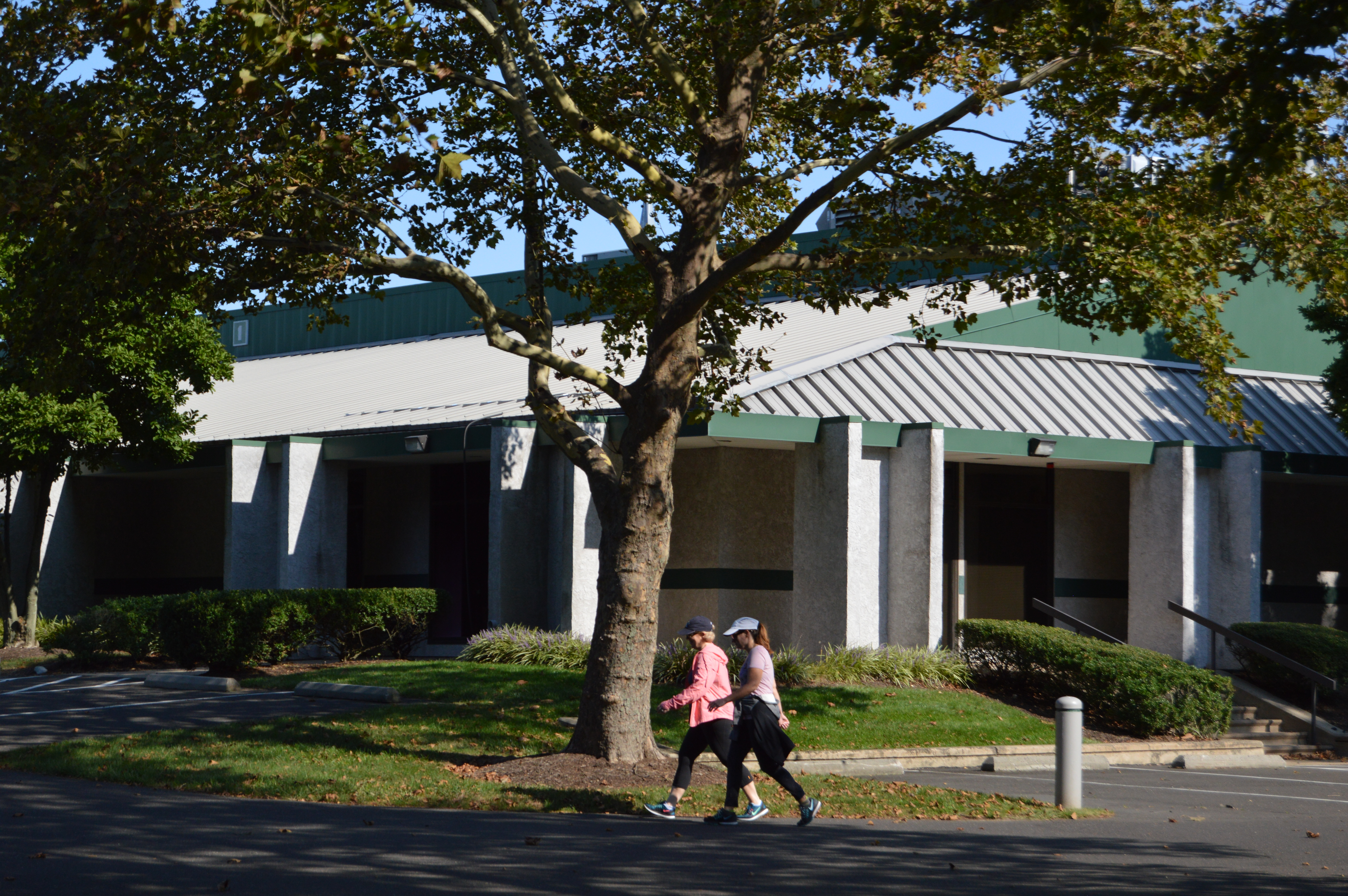
- Final corporate headquarters in Huntingdon Valley, Pennsylvania
- Type: Private
- Industry: Computers
- Founded: 1969; 57 years ago, in Bensalem Township, Pennsylvania, United States
- Founder: Theodor Herzl Levine
- Defunct: July 1992; 34 years ago
- Fate: Acquired by Adobe Inc.
- Headquarters: Huntingdon Valley, Pennsylvania, United States
- Key people: Gregory Boleslavsky (VP); Vadim Brikman (VP)
- Products: System 1000; ReadRight
- Number of employees: 30+ (1988)

OCR Systems, Inc., was an American computer hardware manufacturer and software publisher dedicated to optical character recognition technologies. The company's first product, the System 1000 in 1970, was used by numerous large corporations for bill processing and mail sorting. Following a series of pitfalls in the 1970s and early 1980s, founder Theodor Herzl Levine put the company in the hands of Gregory Boleslavsky and Vadim Brikman, the company's vice presidents and recent immigrants from the Soviet Ukraine, who were able to turn OCR System's fortunes around and expand its employee base. The company released the software-based OCR application ReadRight for DOS, later ported to Windows, in the late 1980s. Adobe Inc. bought the company in 1992.

== History ==
OCR Systems was co-founded by Theodor Herzl Levine (c. 1923 – May 30, 2005). Levine served in the U.S. Army Signal Corps during World War II in the Solomon Islands, where he helped develop a sonar to find ejected pilots in the ocean. After the war, Levine spent 22 years at the University of Pennsylvania, earning his bachelor's degree in 1951, his master's degree in electrical engineering in 1957, and his doctorate in 1968. Alongside his studies, Levine taught statistics and calculus at Temple University, Rutgers University, La Salle University and Penn State Abington. Sometime in the 1960s, Levine was hired at Philco. He and two of his co-workers decided to form their own company dedicated to optical character recognition, founding OCR Systems in 1969 in Bensalem, Pennsylvania.

OCR Systems's first product, the System 1000, was announced in 1970. OCR Systems entered a partnership with 3M to resell the System 1000 throughout the United States in March 1973. This was 3M's entry into the data entry field, managed by the company's Microfilm Products Division and accompanying 3M's suite of data retrieval systems. It soon found use among Texas Instruments, AT&T, Ricoh, Panasonic and Canon for bill processing and mail sorting. Later in the mid-1970s an unspecified Fortune 500 company reneged on a contract to distribute the System 1000; later still a Canadian company distributing the System 1000 in Canada went defunct. Both incidents led OCR Systems to go nearly bankrupt, although it eventually recovered.

By the early 1980s, however, the company was almost insolvent. In 1983 Levine had only $8,000 in his savings and became bedridden with an illness. He left the company in the hands of Gregory Boleslavsky and Vadim Brikman, two Soviet Ukraine expats whom Levine had hired earlier in the 1980s.

Boleslavsky was hired as a wire wrapper for the System 1000 and as a programmer and beta tester for ReadRight—a software package developed by Levine implementing patents from Nonlinear Technology, another OCR-centric company from Greenbelt, Maryland. Boleslavsky in turn recommended Brikman to Levine. The two soon became vice presidents of the company while Levine was bedridden; in Boleslavsky's case, he worked 14-hour work days for over half a year in pursuit of the title.

The two presented OCR Systems' products to the National Computer Conference in Chicago, where they were massively popular. The company soon gained such clients as Allegheny Energy in Pennsylvania and the postal service of Belgium and received an influx of employees—mostly expats from Russia but also Poland and South Korea, as well as American-born workers. To accommodate the company's employee base, which had grown to over 30 in 1988, Levine moved OCR System's headquarters from Bensalem to the Masons Mill Business Park in Bryn Athyn.

Chinon Industries of Japan signed an agreement with OCR Systems in 1987 to distribute OCR's ReadRight 1.0 software with Chinon's scanners, starting with their N-205 overhead scanner. In 1988, OCR opened their agreement to distribute ReadRight to other scanner manufacturers, including Canon, Hewlett-Packard, Skyworld, Taxan, Diamond Flower and Abaton. That year, the company posted a revenue of $3 million. OCR Systems extended their agreement with Chinon in 1989 and introduced version 2.0 of ReadRight.

OCR Systems faced stiff competition in the software OCR market at the turn of the 1990s. The Toronto-based software firm Delrina signed a letter of intent to purchase the company in November 1991, expecting the deal to close in December and have OCR software available by Christmas. OCR was to receive $3 million worth of Delrina shares in a stock swap, but the deal collapsed in January 1992. Delrina later marketed its own Extended Character Recognition, or XCR, software package to compete with ReadRight. In July 1992, OCR Systems was purchased by Adobe Inc. for an undisclosed sum.

== Products ==
=== System 1000 ===
The System 1000 was based on the 16-bit Varian Data 620/i minicomputer with 4 KB of core memory. The system used the 620/i for controlling the paper feed, interpreting the format of the documents, the optical character recognition process itself, error detection, sequencing and output. The System was initially programmed to recognize 1428 OCR (used by Selectrics); IBM 407 print; and the full character sets of OCR-A, OCR-B and Farrington 7B; as well as optical marks and handwritten numbers. OCR Systems promised added compatibility with more fonts available down the line—per request—in 1970. The number of fonts supported was limited by the amount of core memory, which was expandable in 4 KB increments up to 32 KB. The System 1000 later supported generalized typewriter and photocopier fonts.

The rest of the System 1000 comprised the document transport, one or more scanner elements, a CRT display and a Teletype Model 33 or 35. Pages are fed via friction with a rubber belt. Up to three lines could be scanned per document, while the rest of the scanned document could be laid out in any manner granted there was enough space around the fields to be read. The reader initially supported pages as small as 3.25 in by 3.5 in dimension (later supporting 2.6 in by 3.5 in utility cash stubs) all the way to the standard ANSI letter size (8.5 in by 11 in; later 8.5 in by 12 in as used in stock certificates). The initial System 1000 had a maximum throughput of 420 documents per minute per transport (later 500 documents per minute), contingent on document size and content.

A feature unique to the System 1000 over other optical character recognition systems of the time was its ability to alert the operator when a field was unreadable or otherwise invalid. This feature, called Document Referral, placed the document in front of the operator and displayed a blank field on the screen of the included CRT monitor for manual re-entry via keyboard. Once input, data could be output to 7- or 9-track tape, paper tape, punched cards and other mass storage media or to System/360 mainframes for further processing.

The complete System 1000 could be purchased for US$69,000. Options for renting were $1,800 per month on a three-year lease or $1,600 per month for five years. Computerworld wrote that it was less than half the cost of its competitors while more capable and user-friendly. Competing systems included the Recognition Equipment Retina, the Scan-Optics IC/20 and the Scan-Data 250/350.

=== ReadRight ===
ReadRight processes individual letters topographically: it breaks down the scanned letter into parts—strokes, curves, angles, ascenders and descenders—and follows a tree structure of letters broken down into these parts to determine the corresponding character code. ReadRight was entirely software-based, requiring no expansion card to work. Version 2.01, the last version released for DOS, runs in real mode in under 640 KB of RAM. OCR Systems released the Windows-only version 3.0 in 1991 while offering version 2.01 alongside it. The company unveiled a sister product, ReadRight Personal, dedicated to handheld scanners and for Windows only in October 1991. This version adds real-time scanning—each word is updated to the screen while lines are being scanned. ReadRight proper was later made a Windows-only product with version 3.1 in 1992.

The inclusion of ReadRight 2.0 with Canon's IX-12F flatbed scanner led PC Magazine to award it an Editor's Choice rating in 1989. Despite this, reviewer Robert Kendall found qualification with ReadRight's ability to parse proportional typefaces such as Helvetica and Times New Roman. Mitt Jones of the same publication found version 2.01 to have improved its ability to read such typefaces and praised its ease of use and low resource intensiveness. Jones disliked the inability to handle uneven page paragraph column widths and graphics, noting that the manual recommended the user block out graphics with a Post-it Note.

Version 3.1 for Windows received mixed reviews. Mike Heck of InfoWorld wrote that its "low cost and rich collection of features are hard to ignore" but rated its speed and accuracy average. Barry Simon of PC Magazine called it economical but inaccurate, unable to correct errors it did not detect, and found its spellchecker flawed and its speed lacking compared to Calera's WordScan Plus. Gary Berline of the same publication wrote that "ReadRight produced serviceable accuracy on clean files with simple layouts, but at a less than sprightly pace", finding it unable to process small type and multicolumn text with small margins between columns. The software also regularly interpreted graphical illustrations as text in his experience. OCR Systems announced a follow-up release promising to correcting these issues in July 1992, which never came to fruition on account of Adobe buying the company.
