= Allegorithmic =

French software company

Allegorithmic SAS
- Type: Subsidiary
- Industry: Software, 3D design
- Founded: 2003; 23 years ago
- Founder: Sebastien Deguy
- Parent: Adobe, Inc.
- Website: allegorithmic.com

Allegorithmic SAS is a French software company founded in 2003 by Sebastien Deguy.

== History ==
In January 2019, Adobe Inc. acquired the company to integrate its 3D and immersive design with Adobe's Creative Cloud tools as well as expand Allegorithmic's Substance 3D software. That same year, the Project Substance Alchemist open beta was launched, allowing users to edit existing Substance materials or create new ones using “a mixture of manual, parametric, and AI-driven workflows.”

Adobe Substance 3D tools was launched in 2021. Its tool suite includes: Substance 3D Stager, Substance 3D Painter, Substance 3D Sampler, Substance 3D Designer, and Substance 3D Asset Library. Allegorithmic software has been used in the following video games: Horizon Zero Dawn, Forza Horizon 3, Paragon, Steep, Watch Dogs 2, Rainbow 6 Siege, Halo Wars 2, Dead Rising 4, and Uncharted 4: A Thief's End.

Allegorithmic's Substance 3D Designer software won the Academy Award for Technical Achievement in 2023. Its Substance Painter texturing tool was also used in the Oscar-winning short film Mr Hublot and won an Emmy Award in 2024 in the Engineering, Science & Technology category.
