= WebSideStory =

Visual Sciences / WebSideStory
- Company type: Web software company
- Traded as: WSSI (NASDAQ)
- Founded: September 10, 1996
- Headquarters: San Diego, CA, {{{location_country}}}
- Founder: Blaise Barrelet
- CEO: Jeff Lunsford
- Industry: Web Analytics
- Website: websidestory.com
- Current status: Acquired by Adobe (Omniture)

WebSideStory, Inc. (later Visual Sciences), was founded by Blaise Barrelet in 1996 as a web analytics tool and link directory; its products were Hitbox and HBX. The company went public on September 28, 2004 (NASDAQ: WSSI). In 2006, WebSideStory acquired high-end private data analysis and visualization software company Visual Sciences for $57 million. A year after the acquisition, WebSideStory rebranded itself as Visual Sciences, Inc. In January 2008 Visual Sciences, Inc. was acquired by Omniture (NASDAQ: OMTR) for $394 million.

WebSideStory was founded and headquartered in San Diego, California

== Business model evolution ==
WebSideStory originally launched with a SaaS business model, charging customers a monthly fee for web analytics, but finding customers willing to pay for web analytics proved difficult. WebSideStory then pivoted to offer a limited version of the analytics product for free in exchange for a small advertising banner on each website. Users who clicked the banners were directed to a list of top sites owned by WebSideStory, creating an advertising revenue opportunity. Unlike many late '90s Internet startups, WebSideStory did not raise angel funding or venture capital, but became profitable through customers and by displaying banners on their top site list.

In late 1999, WebSideStory opted to target larger brick-and-mortar businesses as customers for their Hitbox product. Customers opted to pay for more in-depth statistics in exchange for removing the traditional Hitbox banner from their websites, giving birth to the "HBX" product line. Once WebSideStory was financially sound, it shuttered the free version of Hitbox and its associated advertising revenues. The company went public in 2004 and eventually purchased Visual Sciences, adopting their name. Visual Sciences was in turn acquired by Omniture in 2008, and then in October 2009 Omniture was acquired again by Adobe Systems, and integrated into the Adobe Marketing Cloud.
