= Domo, Inc. =

American computer software company

- Type: Public
- Traded as: Nasdaq: DOMO (Class B); Russell 2000 Index component
- Industry: Computer Software
- Founded: 2010; 16 years ago
- Founder: Josh James
- Headquarters: American Fork, Utah, U.S.
- Area served: Worldwide
- Key people: Josh James (CEO)
- Revenue: ▲$317.0 million (2025)
- Net income: ▲ −US$59.3 million (2025)
- Number of employees: 824
- Website: domo.com

Domo, Inc. is an American cloud software company based in American Fork, Utah, United States. It specializes in artificial intelligence, business intelligence, and data visualization and is designed to provide real-time access to business data for decision makers across the company with minimal IT involvement. It is a software as a service venture.

== History ==
Domo, Inc. was founded in 2010 by Josh James After leaving Adobe, in October 2010, James started Shacho, Inc. In December 2010, Shacho purchased Lindon-based Corda Technologies. James changed Shacho's name to Domo.

In September 2026, Progress Software acquired Domo's AI and data platform business for $400 million.

== Products ==
In 2021, Domo Everywhere was released. Domo Everywhere is an embedded analytics tool developed to help users embed live, interactive business intelligence dashboards and reports into external applications.

In 2022, Domo added support for multi-cloud deployments and cross-cloud data integration, along with features such as a governance toolkit, sandbox environment, and branding tools, and introduced integrations with Microsoft Office Suite.

Domo’s App Studio was launched in 2024 as a low-code development tool to create analytics apps using live data.

In 2025, Domo announced “Agent Catalyst”, serving as a toolkit within their AI platform. The toolkit allows users to create their own autonomous AI to manage workflows. It is scheduled to launch in October 2025.

Domo offers an Oracle Database Connector that pulls from Oracle databases. Domo also offers a native Snowflake connector and supports integrating with BigQuery.

== Financials ==
Initial investors in Domo include Benchmark Capital and Andreessen Horowitz. In 2011, $20 million came from Silicon Valley–based Institutional Venture Partners. In 2013, the company announced a Series B investment of $60 million.

In February 2014, Domo announced Series C funding of an additional $125 million from multiple investors including TPG Growth, T. Rowe Price, and Viking Global Investors.

In April 2015, Domo, Inc. raised another $200 million in Series D financing with a $2 billion valuation. In March 2016, the company closed a Series D investment round of $131 million.

On April 27, 2017, Domo raised $200 million in Series D funding led by Blackrock, with participation from Capital Group, Glynn Capital Management, and GGV Capital. Domo, Inc. was listed on the NASDAQ Global Exchange on June 29, 2018, with an initial offering of 9,200,000 shares at $21.00 per share.

== Awards and recognition ==
In May 2024, Domo was named to the Women Tech Council (WTC) 2020 Shatter List for hiring and retaining women in IT careers.
