= Researchgruppen =

Swedish network of independent journalists

Researchgruppen is a Swedish network of independent journalists founded 2009. The organisation behind the network is Seppuku Media Ekonomisk Förening. The group's members have been described as people belonging to the autonom extreme left. In a radio documentary for Sveriges radio the group members are also said to have a history with violence.

== Awards ==
- 2014: Six members of the network was nominated a Guldspade
- 2014: Stora Journalistpriset
