= Adobe Experience Cloud =

Online marketing and Web analytics software

- Developer: Adobe
- Initial release: October 24, 2012
- Operating system: Windows, Linux, OS X
- Available in: Multilingual
- Type: Software suite, cloud applications
- License: Software as a service
- Website: www.adobe.com/experience-cloud.html

Adobe Experience Cloud (AEC), formerly Adobe Marketing Cloud (AMC), is a collection of integrated online marketing and web analytics products by Adobe.

== History ==
On September 15, 2009, Adobe Systems announced its intention to purchase Omniture, Inc., a company specializing in online marketing and web analytics based in Orem, Utah. The acquisition, valued at $1.8 billion, was finalized on October 23, 2009. Post-acquisition, Omniture's offerings were progressively integrated into what is now known as Adobe's Digital Marketing Business Unit, alongside other acquisitions such as Day Software and Efficient Frontier.

Adobe Experience Cloud, initially known as Adobe Marketing Cloud, was unveiled in October 2012 as part of Adobe's strategy to phase out the Omniture brand. The suite integrates products from the acquired company, Omniture, along with other services into a unified cloud service.

Adobe Experience Cloud encompasses analytics, social, advertising, media optimization, targeting, web experience management, journey orchestration, and content management services, hosted on Microsoft Azure. The eight main applications are Adobe Analytics, Adobe Target, Adobe Social, Adobe Experience Manager, Adobe Media Optimizer, Adobe Campaign (both Classic and Standard versions), Audience Manager, and Primetime.

In 2013, Adobe acquired Satellite TMS from Search Discovery and rebranded it as Adobe Dynamic Tag Management (Adobe DTM). Then launched Adobe Launch in 2018, its tag management system.

Adobe announced the acquisition of Magento for $1.68 billion on May 21, 2018. This acquisition aimed to incorporate commerce features into the Adobe Experience Cloud. Later that same year, on September 20, Adobe acquired Marketo, a marketing automation company.

By 2021, Adobe Experience Platform Launch was slated to be integrated into the Adobe Experience Platform as part of a broader suite of data collection technologies.

== Products ==
- Adobe Experience Manager (AEM) is an enterprise content management system and digital asset management. Before its acquisition, it was formerly known as Day CQ5.
  - In 2019, Adobe launched a new product under the AEM family known as Edge Delivery Services (EDS), which moves away from the traditional Sling architecture towards an edge-based architecture.
- Adobe Campaign is an enterprise Digital Campaign Marketing System. The software provides cloud-based, web-services service that manages direct marketing campaigns, leads, resources, customer data and analytics. The software also allows companies to design and orchestrate targeted and personalized campaigns from direct mail, e-mail, SMS, MMS and more. This software is based on Algorithmic Marketing to provide personalization. The software was formerly known as Neolane. Currently, Adobe has two separate versions of the product in the name of Adobe Campaign Classic and Adobe Campaign Standard, the complete cloud-based version built and developed by Adobe.*
- Adobe Audience Manager (AAM) is a data management platform. This software is based on algorithmic modeling that allows the use of data science to either expand existing audiences or classify them into personas using lookalike modeling and predictive analytics.
- Adobe Analytics (formerly Omniture), is a widely used tool for web analytics. The tool allows users to define tags embedded in web pages for tracking purposes in order to create customized metrics that can be used for digital marketing and user behavior analysis. Within Adobe Analytics, a tool called Data Warehouse is also provided for scheduling and delivering raw data by email or to FTP server for further data analysis. Unlike some alternatives such as Google Analytics, Adobe Analytics has no free version.
