= Scene7 =

American software subsidiary

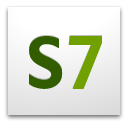
- Industry: computer software
- Founded: San Rafael, California (1990s)
- Headquarters: San Francisco, California
- Parent: Adobe Systems

Scene7 was an American on-demand rich media software company that provided document hosting and interactive publishing services such as online catalogs, targeted email, video, and image management. Scene7's technology allowed users to manipulate product images by zooming in and rotating products, simulating the inspection of merchandise in retail stores. Scene7 became a subsidiary of Adobe Publishing Systems in 2007, and in 2010 was folded into the Adobe Systems model.

The company, founded as a division of Autodesk, created a room decoration computer software called Picture This Home in the mid-1990s. The division was sold to Broderbund in 1998, then spun off as a company called GoodHome.com in June 1999. After GoodHome.com failed to become profitable, it was reorganized and renamed Scene7. It formally launched on January 23, 2001, and focused on helping companies prepare interactive advertisements for consumers. Adobe Systems acquired Scene7 in 2007 for an undisclosed sum.

In 2010, Scene7 ceased to function as a subsidiary of Adobe Systems. Scene 7 was renamed Dynamic Media Classic Publishing System (SPS) and became part of the Adobe family of software products.

== Company ==
A subsidiary of Adobe Systems, Scene7 provides document hosting and interactive publishing services, typically charging clients to convert catalog print files to interactive web pages. The company does most of its business in North America. Scene7 products rely on several Adobe products, including Adobe Photoshop, Adobe InDesign, Adobe Flash, Adobe Illustrator, and Adobe Flex; this relationship existed before Adobe purchased the company. Scene7 does not maintain any servers to host its services; instead, it uses a "pay as you grow" program that only requires it to pay for the resources that it uses.

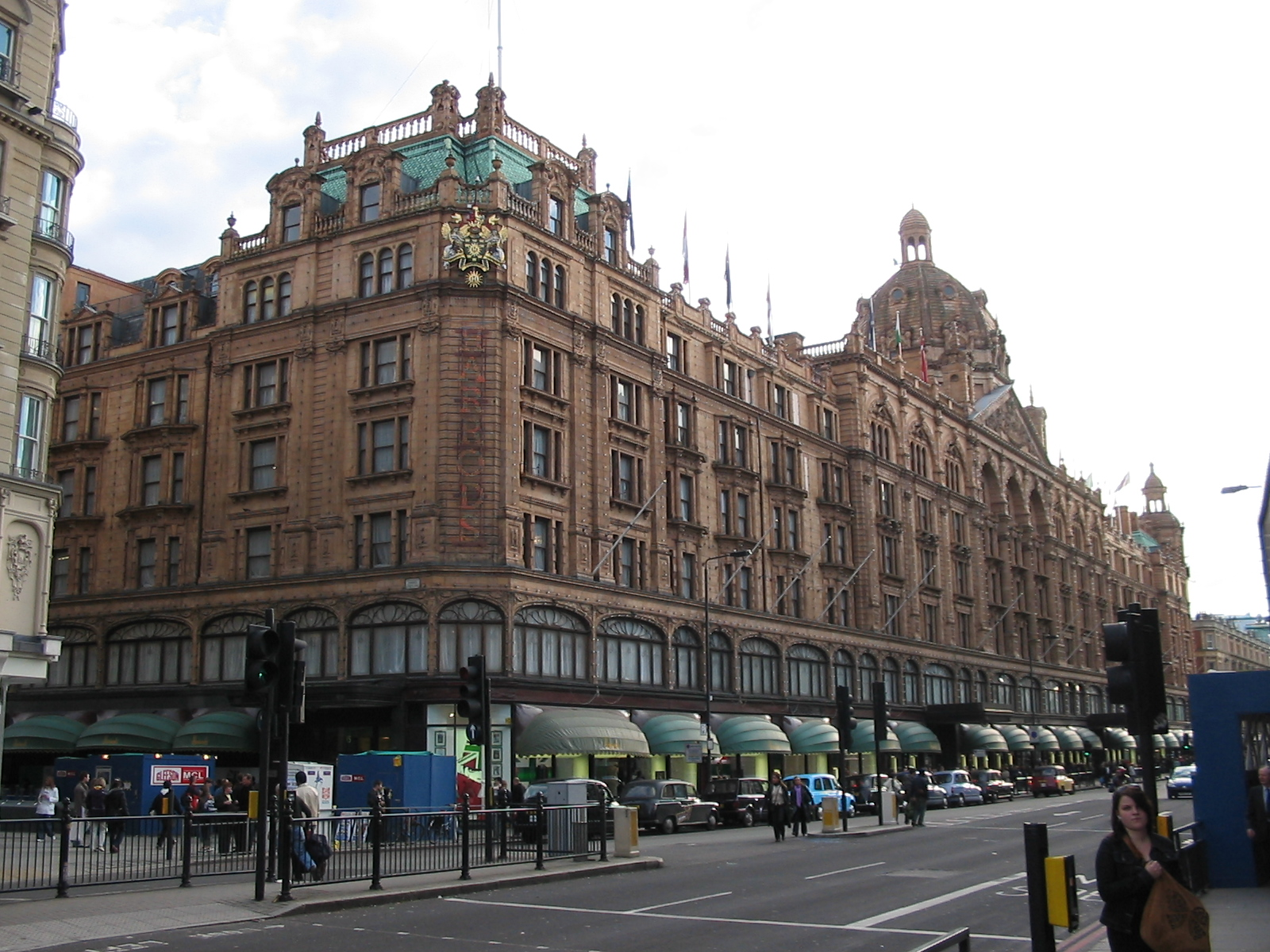
Harrods flagship store in London, England. Scene7 allows visitors to Harrods' website to interact with product images.

== History ==
The company began as a development team that created software called Picture This Home in the mid-1990s for Autodesk in San Rafael, California. In 1998, the software and its team of 40 developers were sold to Broderbund, which was owned by The Learning Company, a subsidiary of Mattel Inc. Broderbund eventually spun Picture This Home off as a company called GoodHome.com in June 1999.

In September 1999, GoodHome.com merged with Alexandria, Virginia-based nHabit.com, a rival company, for an undisclosed sum. After spending several years operating at a loss, GoodHome.com re-organized as Scene7, which formally launched in 2001 with $15 million raised from investors that included Hearst Interactive Media. The new company focused on helping companies prepare interactive advertisements for consumers.

Scene7 moved from San Rafael to Novato, California in 2002 to accommodate more employees. In 2003, the company acquired all of the assets of workflow provider and advertising software company Engage for $1.2 million and assumed its $650,000 debt after Engage filed for Chapter 11 bankruptcy. Since the early 2000s, the company's growth has been fueled by an increase in broadband Internet access, which loads virtual catalogs faster than dial-up Internet access. When catalogs first appeared online in the late 1990s, the graphics took too long to load. After high-speed Internet access became more popular, virtual catalogs quickly grew to become a popular feature of online stores.

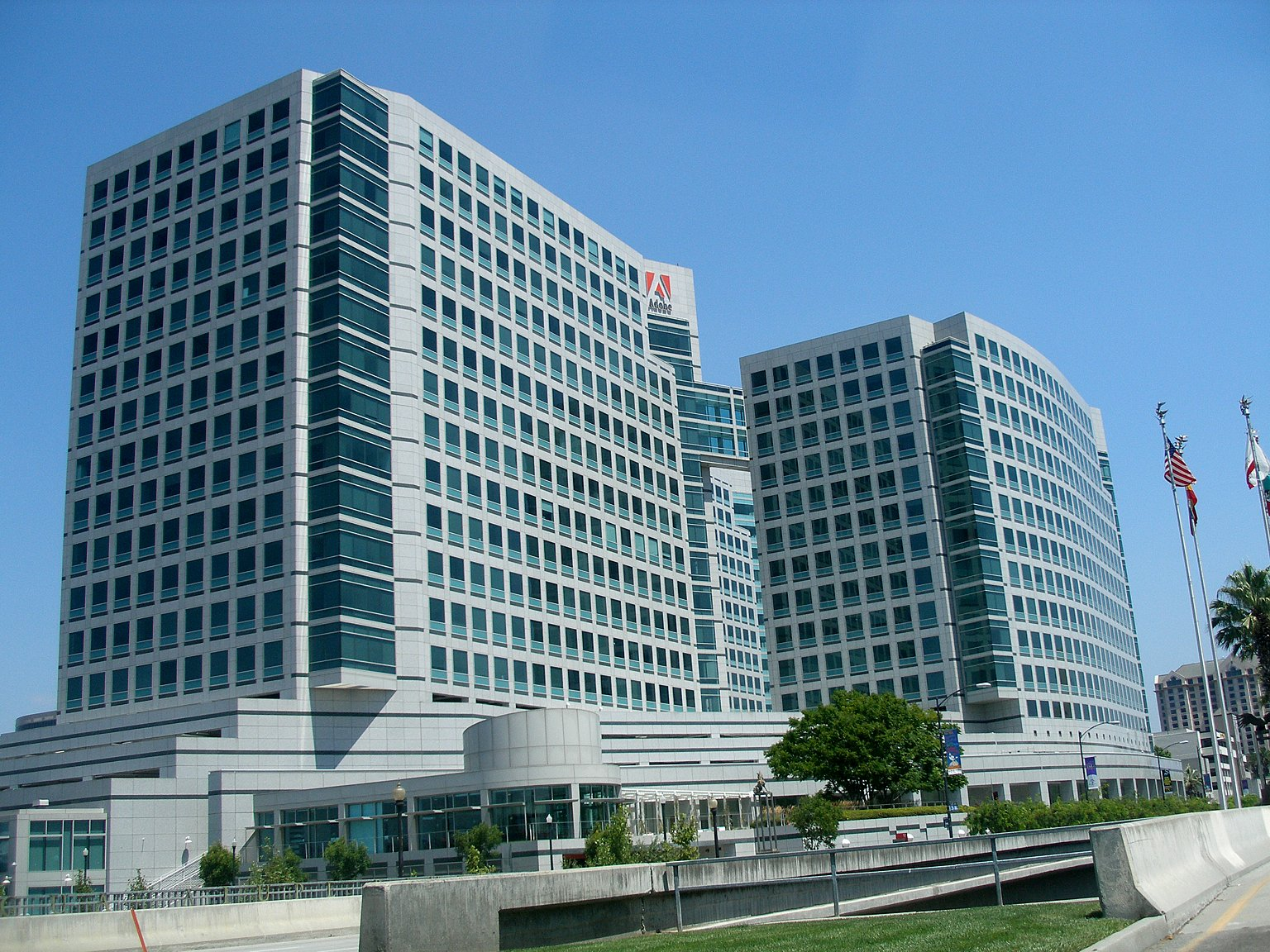
Adobe Systems, based in San Jose, California, acquired Scene7 to help boost its overall services strategy.

Adobe Systems acquired Scene7 in 2007 for an undisclosed sum.
