= Omniture =

Online marketing and analytics business

Adobe Marketing Cloud
- Type: Subsidiary
- Industry: Web Analytics; Market Research; Online Optimization
- Founded: 1996; 30 years ago
- Founder: Josh James; John Pestana
- Headquarters: Lehi, Utah
- Key people: Brad Rencher, Omniture Business Unit SVP and GM
- Products: Adobe SiteCatalyst; Adobe SearchCenter+ Adobe Discover; Adobe Test&Target; Adobe Genesis; Adobe Insight; Adobe Merchandising; Adobe Search&Promote; Adobe Survey; Adobe Recommendations; Adobe DigitalPulse; Adobe Scene7
- Number of employees: > 1,000 (2008)
- Parent: Adobe Systems
- Website: www.omniture.com

Omniture is an online marketing and web analytics business unit in Orem, Utah. It was acquired by Adobe Systems in 2009. Until 2011, Omniture operated as a business unit within Adobe as the "Omniture Business Unit", but as of 2012 Adobe began retiring the Omniture name as former Omniture products were integrated into the Adobe Marketing Cloud.

== History ==
Prior to the development of Omniture, Josh James and John Pestana with Jeremy Young (founder of Uberplay) to develop Omniture's predecessor, SuperStats. SuperStats was developed as a software as a service (SaaS), which worked as an analytic software for small and medium-sized businesses to track statistics in real time. Jeremy Young eventually sold his portion of the interest back to his partners in order to focus on the development of his other businesses. Josh James and John Pestana sold the small business and consumer sectors to Network Solutions in order to focus on enterprise level software, which lead to the development of Omniture in 2002. Omniture was founded by Josh James and John Pestana, and was backed by venture capitalists including Hummer Winblad Venture Partners, University Venture Fund, and Scale Venture Partners. During a period of rapid growth, the company was one of Inc. Magazine's 500 fastest-growing private companies. Omniture was listed on the NASDAQ with OMTR as its ticker symbol in 2006.

Omniture bought behavioral targeting company Touch Clarity for $51.5 million in 2007. In late 2007 the company acquired web analytics company Visual Sciences, Inc. (formerly WebSideStory) for $394 million, and also purchased Offermatica for $65 million. In September 2008 it agreed to acquire the site search and merchandising aspects of Israeli e-commerce search solution provider Mercado for $6.5 million.

On September 15, 2009, Omniture, Inc. and Adobe Systems announced that Adobe would be acquiring Omniture for $1.8 billion. The deal was completed on October 23, 2009, and is now joined by other Adobe acquisitions such as Day Software and Efficient Frontier, as the main components of Adobe's Digital Marketing Business Unit.

In 2009, John Pestana went on to co-found ObservePoint with Rob Seolas.

Adobe vacated the former Omniture offices in Orem, Utah in November 2012, moving a large portion of its Digital Marketing Business Unit to a new facility in Lehi, Utah.

== Criticism ==
Omniture has been accused of using domain names that resemble local network IP addresses (such as 192.168.112.2O7.net, which contains a capital "O", not a zero) in order to hide their involvement in data mining. This has led to speculation that the domain name is used to mischievously or criminally trick users or firewall rules. Omniture's SiteCatalyst and SearchCenter products use the 2o7.net domain name.

Omniture collects data from Apple, Amazon and Adobe, who use Omniture to collect usage statistics across their products. It is possible to opt out of the Omniture data-collection system, and to block the tracking.

== See also ==
- Web.com
- web analytics
- WebSideStory
- software as a service (SaaS)
- e-commerce
- Adobe
