= Rimer =

Rimer may refer to:

== People ==
- Bingo Rimér (born 1975), Swedish photographer
- Colin Rimer (born 1944), English judge
- Danny Rimer (born 1970), Canadian-Swiss venture capitalist
- Jeff Rimer (born 1955), hockey announcer
- J. Thomas Rimer (born 1933), American scholar
- Kirk Rimer, American investment manager
- Lindsay Rimer (1981 – c. 1994), British murder victim
- Neil Rimer (born 1963), Canadian-Swiss venture capitalist
- Rimer Cardillo (born 1944), Uruguayan artist

== Other uses ==
- Rimer, Ohio

== See also ==
- Rime (disambiguation)
- Rimmer, a surname
