= Danny Rimer =

Canadian businessman

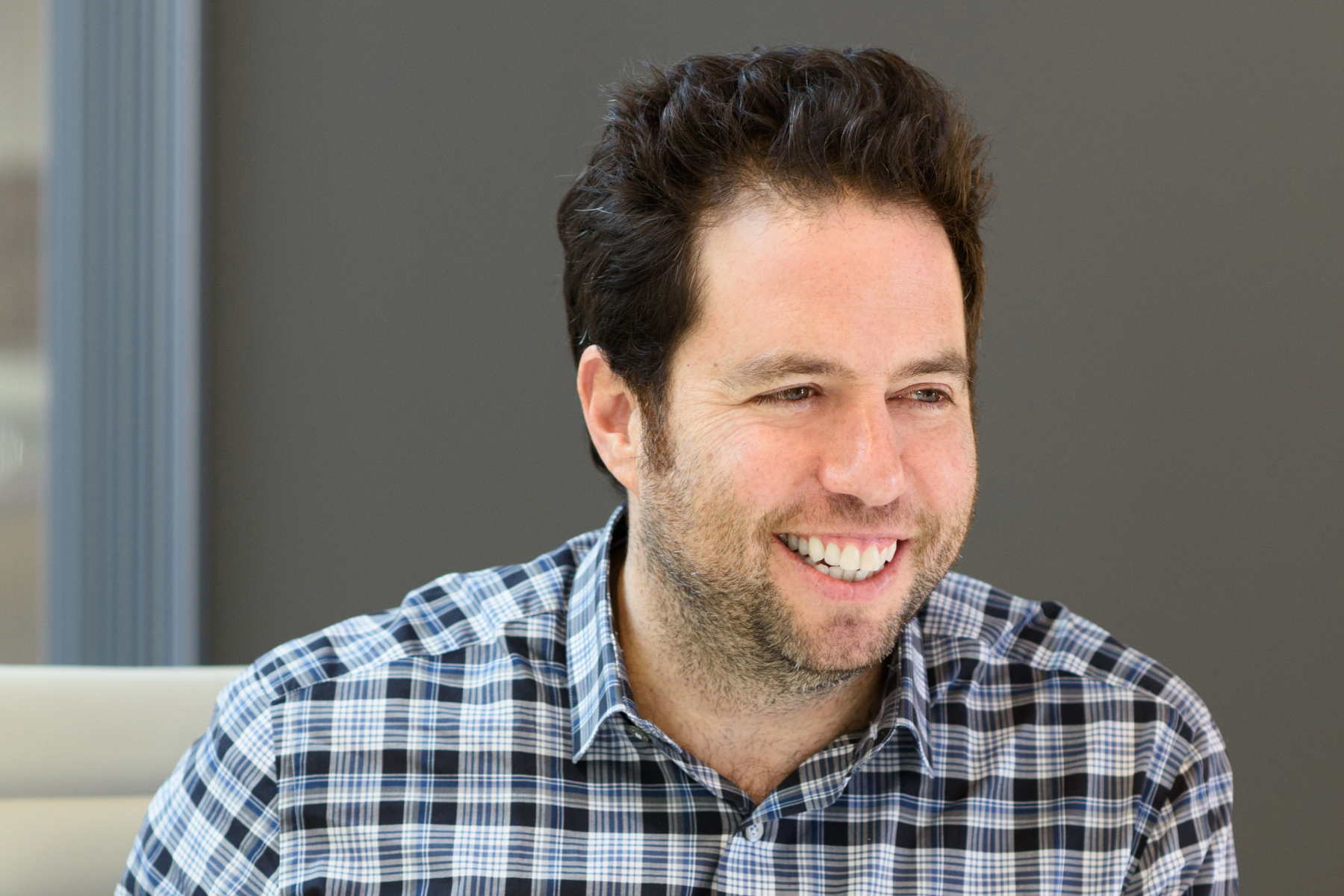
- Born: 1970 (age 55–56); Canada
- Education: Harvard University
- Occupations: Venture capitalist, Partner at Index Ventures

Danny Rimer OBE (born 1970) is a partner at Index Ventures, a global venture capital firm founded in Geneva in 1992. Rimer opened the firm's London office in 2002 and its San Francisco office in 2012. He has become a leading voice on venture capital in Silicon Valley and Europe, and has been actively involved in various philanthropic and cultural activities.

== Early life ==
Rimer was born in Canada, but grew up in Geneva, Switzerland. His father is Gerald Rimer, the founder of Index Securities, the predecessor to Index Ventures, and his brothers are Neil and David, who also work for the firm.

After graduating from Harvard University with a Bachelor of Arts in history and literature, he moved to the San Francisco Bay Area in California.

== Career ==
While in the Bay Area, Rimer and some friends began a company to digitize images of famous artwork and sell the downloads, forging exclusive deals with galleries such as the Louvre and the Uffizi Gallery to commercialize the images.

In 1994, Rimer joined Hambrecht & Quist (now owned by JPMorgan Chase), where he began an Internet sector equity research group. He was managing director and underwriting analyst for Amazon, Netscape and Verisign. and helped to take Netscape public.

Rimer became a general partner of The Barksdale Group in 1999, where he invested in a dozen companies including Crossgain (acquired by BEA Systems), Ofoto (acquired by Kodak) and Tellme Networks (acquired by Microsoft), before joining Index in 2002 to establish the London office. He later co-founded the San Francisco office in 2012 with Index partner Mike Volpi.

In his early years at Index, Rimer made a series of notable investments in infrastructure and services companies such as Skype, MySQL and Last.fm (acquired by CBS for $280 million).

He later led the firm’s investments in 1stdibs, Anki, Boku, Dropbox (Nasdaq: DBX) (in which he led a series B round investment of $250 million in 2011), Etsy (Nasdaq: ETSY), Farfetch (NYSE: FTCH), Flipboard, King (acquired by Activision in 2016 for $5.9 billion), Zesty, and Beauty Pie, among others.

More recently, Rimer has received growing public attention for leading Index's investments in Discord, Patreon, Glossier, Beauty Pie, Otrium, Grailed, and Goat. Most notable among his latest batch of investments is Figma, an online collaborative design platform. Index wrote a seed-stage check for Figma in 2013. In 2022, Adobe announced it would acquire Figma for $20 billion, making Index's share of the company worth $2.6 billion if the deal closes. However, numerous news reports indicated that the U.S. Department of Justice may sue to block the acquisition for violating anti-trust rules. The deal eventually terminated due to regulatory pressure from the European Commission.

Rimer was previously a director at KVS (acquired by Veritas in 2004 for $225 million); Last.fm, Lovefilm (known as "The Netflix of Europe," acquired by Amazon in 2011 for $317 million); MySQL (acquired by Sun Microsystems in 2008 for $1 billion and now part of Oracle); Neoteris (acquired by NetScreen in 2003 for $245 and now part of Juniper Networks); Sky PLC (LSE: SKY); Skype (acquired by eBay in 2005 for $2.6 billion and then by Microsoft in 2011 for $8.5 billion); and TrialPay (acquired by Visa in February 2017.

== Awards and honors ==
Rimer's various awards and honors include:

- The Forbes Midas List of top global VCs, to which he has been named 11 times
- The Forbes Midas List of European VCs, to which he has been nominated in 2019
- Fortune magazine's 40 under 40 list of business’s rising young stars.
- The New York Times' and CB Insights' list of the Top 20 Venture Capitalists Worldwide, each year since the list's inception (2016 through 2018)
- Officer of the Order of the British Empire (OBE) for service to business and charity.

He is a fixture at the Allen & Company Sun Valley Conference, an annual gathering of business leaders, political figures, and major figures in the philanthropic and cultural spheres.

== Philanthropy and non-profit involvement ==
Rimer serves on the board of Maggie’s Cancer Caring Centres, a network of drop-in healthcare centers across the United Kingdom and Hong Kong, with the aim of helping cancer patients. He was formerly on the board of trustees at San Francisco Museum of Modern Art (SFMOMA).
