= Mike Volpi =

Italian venture capitalist

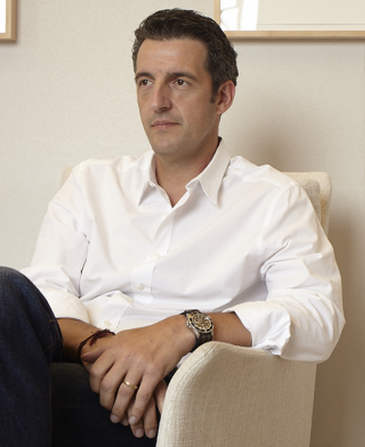
- Mike Volpi in 2015
- Born: Michelangelo Volpi; December 13, 1966 (age 59); Milan, Italy
- Education: Stanford University
- Occupations: Venture capitalist, businessperson
- Years active: 1989-present
- Employer: Partner at Hanabi Capital
- Board member of: Stanford Health Care, Ferrari N.V.

Michelangelo "Mike" Volpi (born 13 December 1966) is an Italian-American businessman and venture capitalist. He worked as an engineer, eventually becoming chief strategy officer at Cisco Systems during the company’s growth era, acquiring over 70 companies in less than five years. He co-founded Index Ventures’ San Francisco office with Danny Rimer in 2009, and currently serves as general partner at Hanabi Capital.

== Early life and education ==
Volpi was born in Milan, Italy. When he was five, his family moved to Tokyo, Japan, where he lived until he moved to the United States in 1984 to attend college at Stanford University. There, he earned a B.S. in mechanical engineering as well as an M.S. in manufacturing systems engineering. After working at HP for several years, he returned to Stanford to earn an M.B.A. from the Graduate School of Business in 1994.

== Career ==
Volpi began his career at Hewlett Packard's optoelectronics division in 1989 where he was both in engineering and marketing. Volpi joined Cisco Systems in 1994 in the nascent business development group. He was promoted to leading acquisitions at Cisco starting in April 1996. As chief strategy officer he led corporate strategy, business development, and strategic alliances. Their acquisition strategy of Volpi and his team at Cisco is used as model for technology mergers and acquisitions. he was promoted to the chief strategy office working for CEO John Chambers until 2000. Some press speculated he was heir apparent to Chambers. Moving into an operational role as a senior vice president and general manager, he led the routing and switching teams, then co-led the routing and service provider group with Prem Jain until 2007. During this time Cisco's first Carrier Routing System product was announced, the CRS-1, in 2004.

After Cisco in 2007 he became entrepreneur in residence (EIR) at Sequoia Capital. A few months later, he was appointed CEO of Joost, an Internet startup focused on online TV which was founded by Skype founders Niklas Zennstrom and Janus Friis. In 2009, Volpi joined Index Ventures as a partner, but concurrently retained his position of chairman of Joost. In September 2009, Skype's founders filed a lawsuit against Volpi for alleged use of confidential information in conjunction with the proposed divestiture of Skype from eBay. Volpi was also removed by Joost shareholders from his role as company chair, with Joost releasing a statement at the time saying, "The company and its Board of Directors is conducting an investigation into Mr. Volpi's actions during his tenure as CEO and as Chairman." The lawsuit was dropped in November 2009 after a settlement in which Zennstrom and Friis received a 14% stake in Skype, worth $400 million at the time, as well as exclusion of Index Ventures and Volpi—who had been considered as a potential leader of Skype after the divestiture—from the sale of the company.

At Index, Volpi invested in early-stage companies, primarily across autonomous driving, open source, and artificial intelligence. Volpi has served on the boards of Index portfolio companies, including Aurora, Big Switch Networks, Blue Bottle Coffee, Confluent, Covariant, Elastic, Kong Inc., Hortonworks, Pure Storage, Scale AI, Sonos, Tekion Corp, Wealthfront, and Zuora. During Volpi's time at Index, the firm grew its office in San Francisco to an equal presence on both sides of the Atlantic Ocean.

Volpi co-founded Hanabi Capital, an early-stage venture capital firm, in 2025. Volpi serves as general partner. The firm invests in artificial intelligence, software infrastructure, and similar technology company startups. As of 2026, notable investments include Cognition AI and Mind Robotics.

== Councils and boards ==
Mike Volpi sits on the boards of a number of public and private companies in which he has invested, including ClickHouse, Cohere, Hebbia, Kong, Scale, and Wealthfront. Volpi previously served as a non-executive board member of Fiat Chrysler Automobiles and a board member of Ericsson. He was an independent director for Exor, and now serves on the European investment firm's partners council.

Volpi also serves on the boards of Stanford Health Care and Ferrari N.V..

== Personal life ==
Volpi is trilingual in English, Italian and Japanese, and is married to Toni Cupal with 2 children.

His father is Vittorio Volpi, an executive at the United Bank of Switzerland.

== Awards ==
- Forbes Midas List: World's Smartest Tech Investors, 2015
- MIT Technology Review - Innovators Under 35, 1999
- Network World: 1999 Power Issue – 25 Most Powerful People in Networking
- The New York Times' and CB Insights' 2018 list of the top 100 venture capitalists worldwide featured Volpi at number 34.
