= Physical Intelligence Inc. =

Robotics company

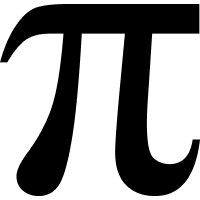
- Type: Private
- Industry: Artificial intelligence
- Founded: 2024
- Founders: Karol Hausman, Sergey Levine, Chelsea Finn, Brian Ichter, Lachy Groom, Adnan Esmail, Quan Vuong
- Headquarters: San Francisco, California, United States
- Products: Machine learning models
- Website: pi.website

Physical Intelligence Inc. is an American artificial intelligence and software research company based in San Francisco, California. Founded in 2024 by researchers from Google DeepMind, Stanford University, and the University of California, Berkeley, the company aims to bring a universal artificial intelligence model to the physical world through robotics and other physical devices. Rather than focusing on internal hardware manufacturing, the company prioritizes the production of general-use models applied across a diverse field of physical applications.

== History ==
Physical Intelligence was founded in February 2024 by researchers including Karol Hausman, Brian Ichter, and Quan Vuong of Google DeepMind, Chelsea Finn of Stanford University, Sergey Levine of University of California, Berkeley, Adnan Esmail of Anduril, and Australian entrepreneur Lachy Groom.

== Technology ==
Physical Intelligence develops artificial intelligence systems designed to enable robots to perform tasks in real world environments. Its work focuses on machine learning models that can operate across multiple robotic platforms.

The company’s research includes models that combine visual input, language instructions, and motor control. These systems are intended to allow robots to interpret sensory information and execute actions in response to commands.The company primarily develops software systems rather than manufacturing robotic hardware.

Model architecture

Physical Intelligence specializes in developing Vision-Language-Action (VLA) models for operating physical hardware and automation systems. The company’s initial iteration, π0, combines a Vision-Language model (VLM) with an action-expert flow-matching model. The hybrid system allows agents to process linguistic and visual input and produce functional motor commands. This allows the model to perform dexterous tasks such as sorting objects.

Following iterations build on this architecture. The π0.5 release moved toward broader, open-world generalization in otherwise cluttered systems. Introduced in April 2026, π0.7 is a steerable generalist model designed to perform multi-step tasks across various robots, scenes, and skills. Emphasized are diverse multimodal prompts such as lingual and visual inputs. The π0.7 model is not simply instructed, but conditioned on how tasks are to be carried out.

Deployment of robots

Physical Intelligence has begun deploying early robotic systems in real-world environments in San Francisco to perform routine operational tasks. The company has tested robots in short-term rental properties to fold laundry and has also placed its systems in the backrooms of Dandelion Chocolate, where they are used to fold cardboard boxes for packaging. These deployments focus on automating repetitive, low-value work so that staff can concentrate on more specialized tasks, such as chocolate production. The company's technology is still in an early stage of development and is not yet commercially sold. Bloomberg reported that the company views these trials as part of developing practical real-world applications for its robotic systems.

== Funding ==
In 2024, Physical Intelligence has raised $400 million at a valuation of about $2.4 billion. Investors in that round included Jeff Bezos, OpenAI, Thrive Capital, Lux Capital, and Bond Capital.

In 2025, Physical Intelligence raised an additional $600 million in funding at a valuation of approximately $5.6 billion. The round was led by CapitalG and included participation from Lux Capital, Thrive Capital, Jeff Bezos, Index Ventures, Sequoia, and T. Rowe Price.

In 2026, Bloomberg reported that the company was raising $1 billion from doubling it's valuation to $11 billion. Investors included Founders Fund, Lightspeed, Thrive Capital, Index Fund, NVIDIA, Jeff Bezos, T. Rowe Price.

== See also ==
- List of artificial intelligence companies
- Physical artificial intelligence
