= Lachy Groom =

Angel investor

- Born: Perth, Australia
- Occupations: Entrepreneur, angel investor, technology executive
- Known for: Founder, LGF; Co-founder, Physical Intelligence Inc.

Lachy Groom is an Australian entrepreneur, angel investor, and technology executive. He is the founder of the investment firm LGF and a co‑founder of the robotics company Physical Intelligence.

== Early life and education ==
Groom was born in Perth, Western Australia. At 11-years-old, he started learning to code in HTML/CSS and founded several online businesses before reaching adulthood. These included PSDtoWP, a service that converted Photoshop files to WordPress sites, and iPadCaseFinder, a platform for locating iPad cases. He also founded PAGGStack.com, an e-commerce website for nutritional supplements, as well as CardNap, a marketplace for reselling discount gift cards, and TheWP.co, a WordPress development service. Several of his early ventures, including PSDtoWP and iPadCaseFinder, were sold while he was still a teenager.

== Career ==
=== Stripe ===
After graduating from high school, Groom joined Stripe, a financial technology company, as its 30th employee. He worked on product, growth, and operations functions, and served as the Head of Issuing. He also led Stripe's international expansion into Singapore, Hong Kong, and New Zealand.

=== Angel investing and LGF ===
Following his departure from Stripe, Groom became an angel investor. He is the founder and sole general partner of LGF, an investment firm. He has backed early-stage technology companies that later achieved significant valuations, including Figma, Notion, Ramp, and Lattice.

In 2020, The Wall Street Journal reported that Groom was raising a second fund, LGF II, targeting approximately $100 million, following a first fund of $48 million. His second fund led investments in startups including enterprise software firm WorkOS and video and audio developer platform Daily.

In 2021, Groom raised $250 million for the third fund. The third fund’s first investment was in Boston-based Blues Wireless, which connects cellular devices to the cloud. Groom co-led the $22 million round, announced in March 2022, with Sequoia Capital.

=== Physical Intelligence ===
Groom co‑founded Physical Intelligence, a robotics company based in San Francisco focused on developing machine learning models for robotic systems. The company’s research aims to enable robots to generalize tasks across multiple hardware platforms and environments. Physical Intelligence has received funding from venture capital firms including Sequoia Capital, Khosla Ventures, and Thrive Capital.
