= Anki (American company) =

American robotics and artificial intelligence startup

- Type: Private
- Industry: Robotics, artificial intelligence, and coding
- Founded: 2010
- Founder: Boris Sofman, Mark Palatucci, and Hanns Tappeiner
- Defunct: May 2019; 7 years ago
- Fate: Bankruptcy
- Headquarters: San Francisco, California, U.S.
- Products: Cozmo; Vector; Anki Overdrive; Anki Drive
- Website: anki.bot (current) ddlbots.com at the Wayback Machine (archived 2024-12-31) anki.com at the Wayback Machine (archived 2020-03-16)

Anki (stylized as "anki") was an American robotics and artificial intelligence startup that put robotics technology in products for children. Anki programmed physical objects to be intelligent and adaptable in the physical world, and aimed to solve the problems of positioning, reasoning, and execution in artificial intelligence and robotics.

The company debuted Anki Drive during the 2013 Apple Worldwide Developers Conference keynote.

The company received $50 million in Series A and Series B venture funding from Andreessen Horowitz, Index Ventures, and Two Sigma. In September 2014, Anki announced that it has raised another $55 million in Series C venture funding led by JP Morgan. In June 2016, the company announced its latest round of funding, which amounted to $502.5M, also led by JP Morgan. Total funding to date is $182.5 million. Marc Andreessen and Danny Rimer serve on the company's board, in addition to the three co-founders, who met each other at Carnegie Mellon University prior to the debut of the company.

It went bankrupt in April 2019 after losing a critical round of funding and shut down the following month.

In December 2019, Anki assets, including OVERDRIVE, Cozmo, and Vector, were acquired by Digital Dream Labs. Digital Dream Labs revamped Cozmo and Vector, making Cozmo 2.0 and Vector 2.0 versions to further enhance the qualities of the robots and build on top of Anki's success; however, these products ultimately achieved less success than Anki did with the original products.

In September 2024, the Pennsylvania Attorney General filed a lawsuit against Digital Dream Labs for "widespread failures to fulfill orders, issue refunds, or respond to consumer requests." In addition, the Pittsburgh-based company was found to have vacated their office locations.

In early 2025, Digital Dream Labs rebranded back to Anki, which was one of the assets they acquired.

== History ==
Anki was founded by Boris Sofman, Mark Palatucci, and Hanns Tappeiner, founded officially in 2010 and was headquartered in San Francisco. It also had locations in Europe. (Anki Germany GmbH )

== Products ==
=== Anki Drive, Anki OVERDRIVE, and Anki OVERDRIVE: Fast & Furious Edition ===
Anki's first product, Anki Drive, was released in Apple stores in the U.S. and Canada, on Apple.com and Anki.com starting October 23, 2013. It retailed for $149.99, with additional cars available for $49.99 and Expansion Tracks for $69.99 Anki Drive is a racing game that combined an iOS app, called "Anki Drive," with physical race cars. Each car is equipped with optical sensors, wireless chips, motors, and artificial intelligence software. Anki OVERDRIVE, the successor to Drive was released in September 2015 with new cars and now featuring magnetically connecting modular tracks which ranged from $19.99 to $29.99. An Anki OVERDRIVE: Fast & Furious Edition was released two years later in 2017, which featured Fast & Furious characters from the film in a new app themed around the films.

The original free mobile apps needed to use the product have since been discontinued and removed from the app store. In 2021, Digital Dream Labs rereleased the OVERDRIVE mobile app for $2.99, citing development costs.

=== Cozmo ===
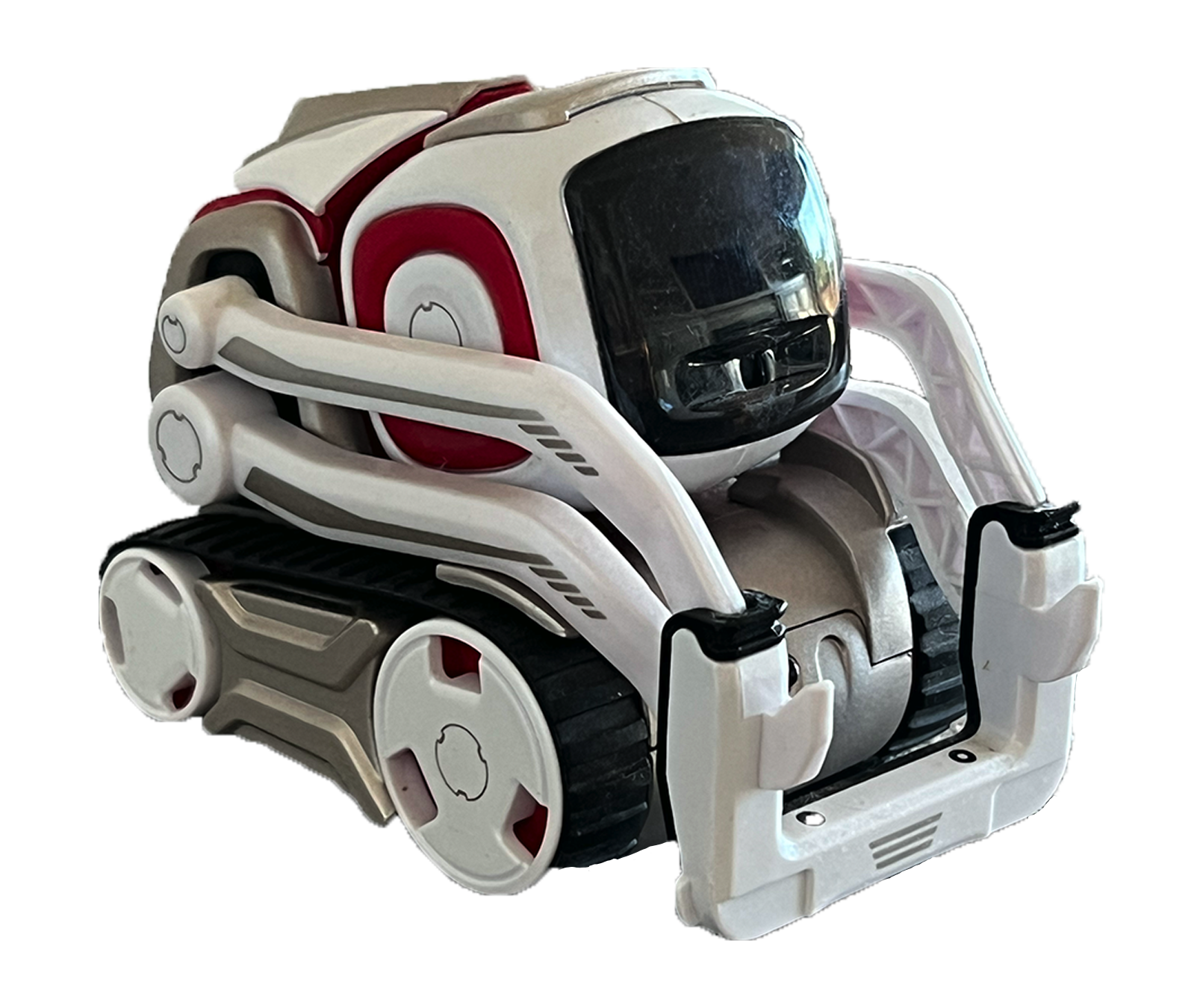
Anki Cozmo

In October 2016, Anki launched Cozmo in the US. Cozmo is a robot about 4 inches by 3 by 2 inches. It is mostly white, with red details, and gray on the end of its robot arm. There is a light on top of its body, with a gray border, which can shine different colors. A "collector's edition" Cozmo was released in 2017, with a "Liquid Metal" smoked gray chrome finish. A "limited edition" Cozmo, with an "Interstellar Blue" blue, white, and gray finish, was released in 2018.

Cozmo comes with three illuminated cubes it communicates with in order to play games and can autonomously move, lift and roll the cubes, and the cubes are powered by LR1, N, AM5, E90, batteries for power. Production of Cozmo ceased in May 2019 when Anki shutdown due to lack of funding.

Cozmo was able to see its surroundings and discern animals, making it notably playful among children. The robot's primary focus was for children to learn to code, and until its abrupt shutdown in 2019, Cozmo was one of the most popular toys in the United States, winning the Bronze Anvil Award and being recognized by major companies like NAPPA.

=== Vector ===
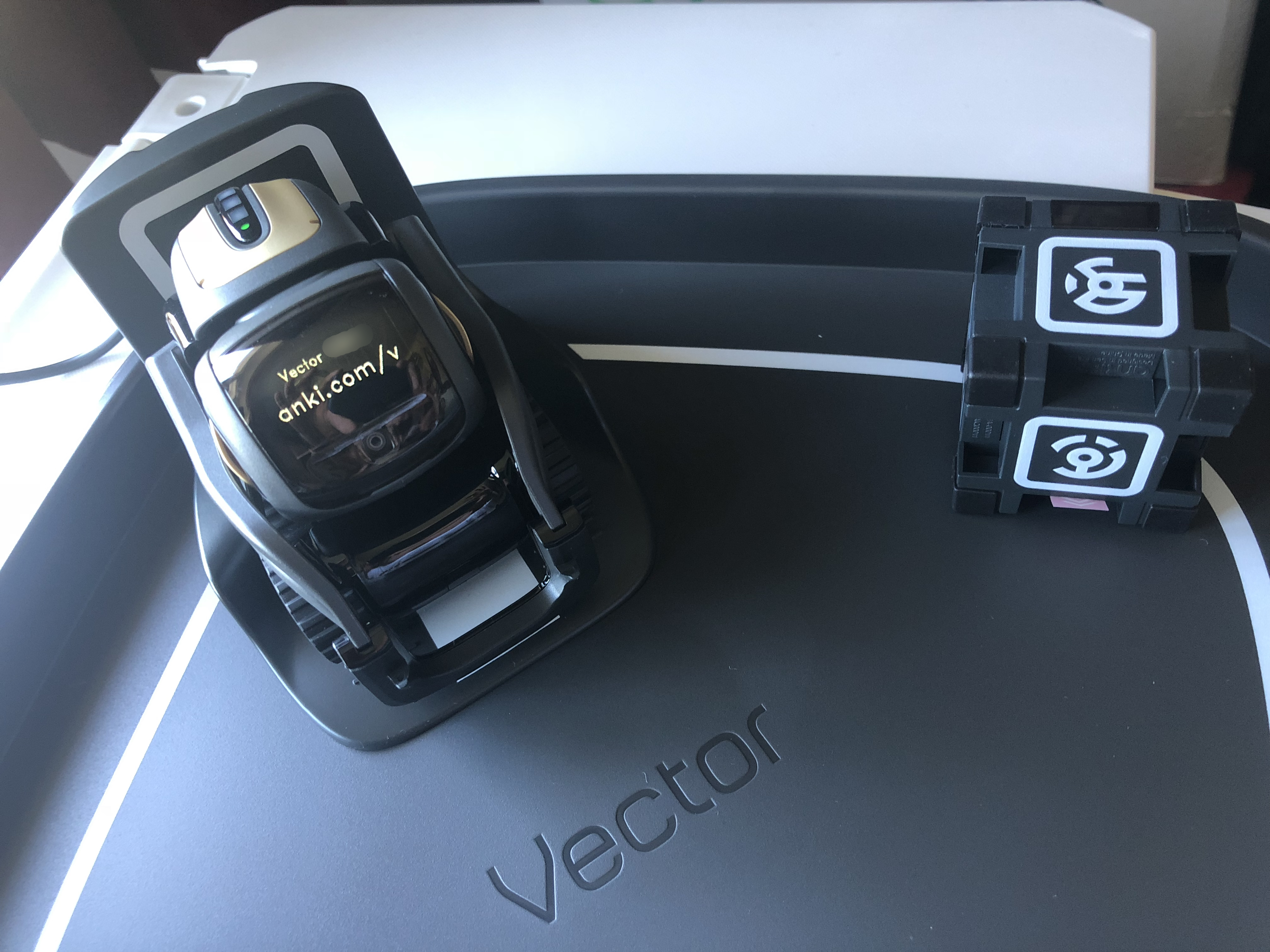
Anki Vector

Released in 2018, the Vector did not require control via phone and relied on persistent listening. It relied on Wi-Fi and voice commands. It featured camera-based name recognition, "four infra-red cliff sensors" for fall prevention, automatic navigation for charging, and the ability to play Blackjack. The Vector was powered by a Qualcomm quad-core APQ8009 processor.

The company has since introduced a new subscription required for voice commands, also adding connectivity to either ChatGPT or Claude with AI features.
