= Sergey Levine =

Computer scientist and professor

- Occupation: Computer Science professor
- Employer: University of California, Berkeley

Academic background
- Education: Stanford University (BS, MS, PhD)
- Doctoral advisor: Vladlen Koltun

Academic work
- Discipline: Computer science
- Sub-discipline: Machine learning, Robotics, Reinforcement learning
- Institutions: University of Washington, University of California, Berkeley
- Doctoral students: Chelsea Finn

Sergey Levine is a computer scientist and professor at UC Berkeley specializing in robotics and machine learning. He is a co-founder of the company Physical Intelligence.

== Education ==
Levine received his Bachelor of Science and Master of Science degrees in Computer Science from Stanford University. In college, he had an internship at NVIDIA. Levine completed his Ph.D. in Computer Science at Stanford, where his doctoral research focused on robot learning, optimal control, and data-driven methods for acquiring control policies in complex robotic systems. Levine was also a post-doctoral researcher at the Robot Learning Lab at UC Berkeley, with Pieter Abbeel.

== Academic career ==
In 2015, Levine joined Google as a part-time research scientist to work on machine intelligence. Shortly after, he began a faculty appointment at the University of Washington School of Computer Science & Engineering.

In 2016, Levine joined the faculty of the University of California, Berkeley, where he is a professor in the Department of Electrical Engineering and Computer Sciences. At Berkeley, he leads a research group working at the intersection of robotics, machine learning, and control.

His research has centered on reinforcement learning, imitation learning, and scalable robot learning systems. Levine’s work has explored both model-based and model-free approaches, with an emphasis on enabling robots and other autonomous agents to acquire skills from large-scale data. His group has contributed to methods that directly map high-dimensional sensory inputs, such as images, to motor actions using deep neural networks.

== Research contributions ==
Levine worked on deep reinforcement learning for robotic control, including the development of guided policy search, which trains deep neural networks to execute complex robotic tasks. He contributed to end-to-end visuomotor policy learning, model-based reinforcement learning for sample-efficient control, and offline reinforcement learning from large robot datasets. His work enables robots to learn complex behaviors directly from high-dimensional sensory inputs and generalize across tasks and environments.

== Awards ==
Sergey Levine has received the Presidential Early Career Award for Scientists and Engineers (PECASE) in 2025, and the MIT Technology Review’s Innovators Under 35 (2016).
