= Cozmo =

Educational robot for kids

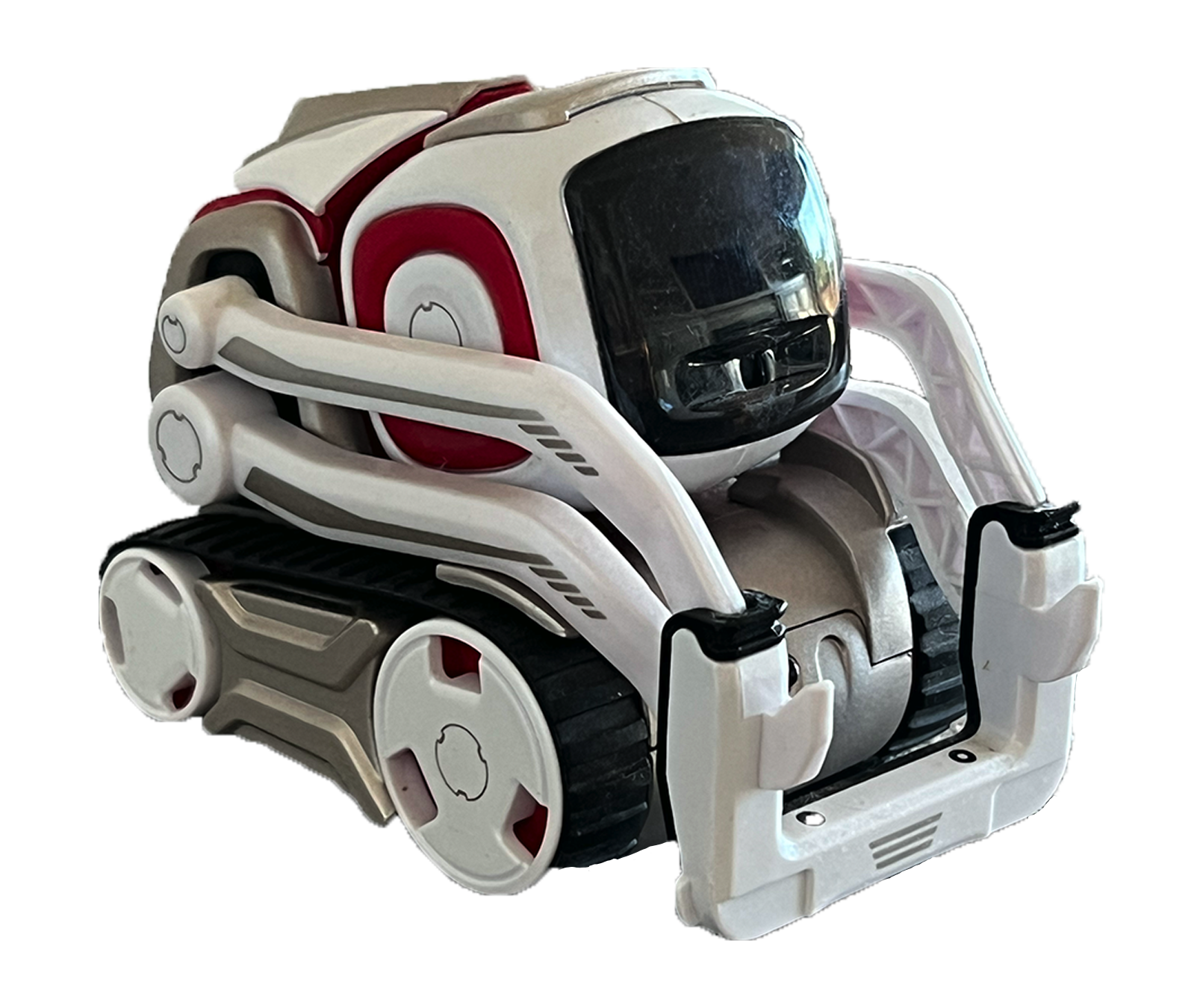
- The first Cozmo model
- Manufacturer: Anki
- Inventor: Anki
- Year of creation: 2016
- Price: US$180
- Website: https://anki.bot/pages/meet-cozmo

Cozmo is a miniature robot created by the defunct company Anki. Cozmo's base model, is a small, white and gray robot with red highlights. It makes use of distinct expressions, dubbed the "emotion engine", in order to mimic human emotion. Later editions came in red and white, gray and black and another in blue.

== Functions ==
Cozmo has a companion app for smartphones that connects via Wi-Fi, used to both allow better interaction between Cozmo and the user, as well as offloading heavier processing requirements to the smartphone.

Cozmo sees its environment with a camera capable of detecting faces. In November 2016, its camera was updated to include "night vision". Cozmo has an "explorer mode", in which the user can manage Cozmo while it moves around its environment.

Included with Cozmo are proprietary blocks that contain sensors, used both to play games and allow Cozmo to maintain a better sense of its environment. Use of these blocks allows for multiple games to be played by both the user and Cozmo using the smartphone app.

- Quick Tap sees Cozmo and the user race to touch a block whenever the colored lights match. Many reviewers found that while Cozmo initially seemed to have slower reaction times, its speed increased as the game was played.
- Keepaway involves the user attempting to bring a block close to Cozmo and pulling it back before Cozmo can touch it.

After playing a game, Cozmo will react by appearing frustrated when it loses and celebrating when it wins.

Cozmo also has a series of mechanics called "needs", in which the user must do several activities to "maintain" Cozmo. One of the needs is "energy", where a cube must be shaken and placed in front of Cozmo for it to "absorb" the energy.

"Cozmo Performs", a mode added in 2018, allows users to directly control Cozmo's expressions with the mobile app.

== Design and specifications ==
Cozmo is a small, lightweight robot with a singular arm and two treads. Cozmo's body is primarily white and gray with red highlights, with a black, cube-shaped OLED display used as a face. It has a single, excavator-like arm used to touch and interact with its environment and the user, as well as pick up the cubes that come packaged with it.

== Development ==
Development documents for Cozmo, depicting behavioral notes and animation storyboards

Since the announcement of Anki Drive in 2013, Anki had specialized in toy-like robots and artificial intelligence. When developing Anki Drive, Anki co-founder and president Hanns Tappeiner said he "realized that characters and personalities are a big deal", though "cars aren’t the best form factor to bring personalities out". This led to the development of Cozmo, a small robot that aimed to "bring a character to life which you would normally only see in movies".

When developing Cozmo, Anki decided to turn necessary machine learning into its personality. For example, it will act curious when it needs to gather information about its surroundings. The development staff created a proprietary set of algorithms called an "emotion engine", which allows Cozmo to accurately mimic human emotion. Anki co-founder and CEO Boris Sofman stated in an interview how Cozmo was purposefully designed to be imperfect, as he found perfection "boring". He elaborated by saying that "when [Cozmo] goes and fails to do something, that's not a bad thing", and that designing Cozmo to react to its own failure creates "a good opportunity to show off the emotions it generates". The design of Cozmo's animations and expressions were led by animator Carlos Baena, who previously worked with Pixar to animate several films. Cozmo's animations also utilize Maya in order to render some of Cozmo's animations.

Cozmo released in the United States on October 16, 2016, at a retail price of US$180. Anki published a beta version of Cozmo's software development kit (SDK) at launch. A limited edition "Interstellar Blue" model was released on November 2, 2018.

On June 26, 2017, alongside the full release of the SDK, called the "Cozmo Code Lab", an update was released that made use of Scratch to provide simpler coding for a younger audience. Tappeiner stated that Cozmo's coding offerings made him realize that it "is very much like an operating system like iOS or Android, but for a robot". In November 2017, Anki hosted Cozmo: Lost in Reddit, an interactive livestream which Taylor Hatmaker of TechCrunch described as "Twitch Plays Pokémon but with IRL puzzles". The "Code Lab" was updated in December 2017 to include several other capabilities, most notably "if statements".

Anki went bankrupt and shut down in April 2019 after failing to secure new investments, despite initially raising US$200,000,000. Later that year, Digital Dream Labs acquired the ownership of Cozmo, as well as its successor Vector. Digital Dream Labs relaunched the robots in 2021.

== Reception ==
Upon Cozmo's reveal, CNET said that it "felt like a real-life version of WALL-E". Engadget's Devindra Hardawar described Cozmo's personality and mannerisms as "like a child", citing Cozmo's curiosity and nervousness, as well as it being easily frustrated "when things don't go its way", which contributed to a personality he found "endearing". Nick Statt of The Verge also praised Cozmo's "quirks", saying that they reminded him of his childhood experiences of exploring "something that feels mysteriously organic". TechRadar's Marc Chacksfield called Cozmo a "fantastic" toy, and that it had him "smiling time and time again".

=== Sales ===
Cozmo had reportedly sold "hundreds of thousands" of units by August 2018. Anki also claimed that Cozmo was the best-selling toy on Amazon in the United States, the United Kingdom and France in August 2018.

== Legacy ==
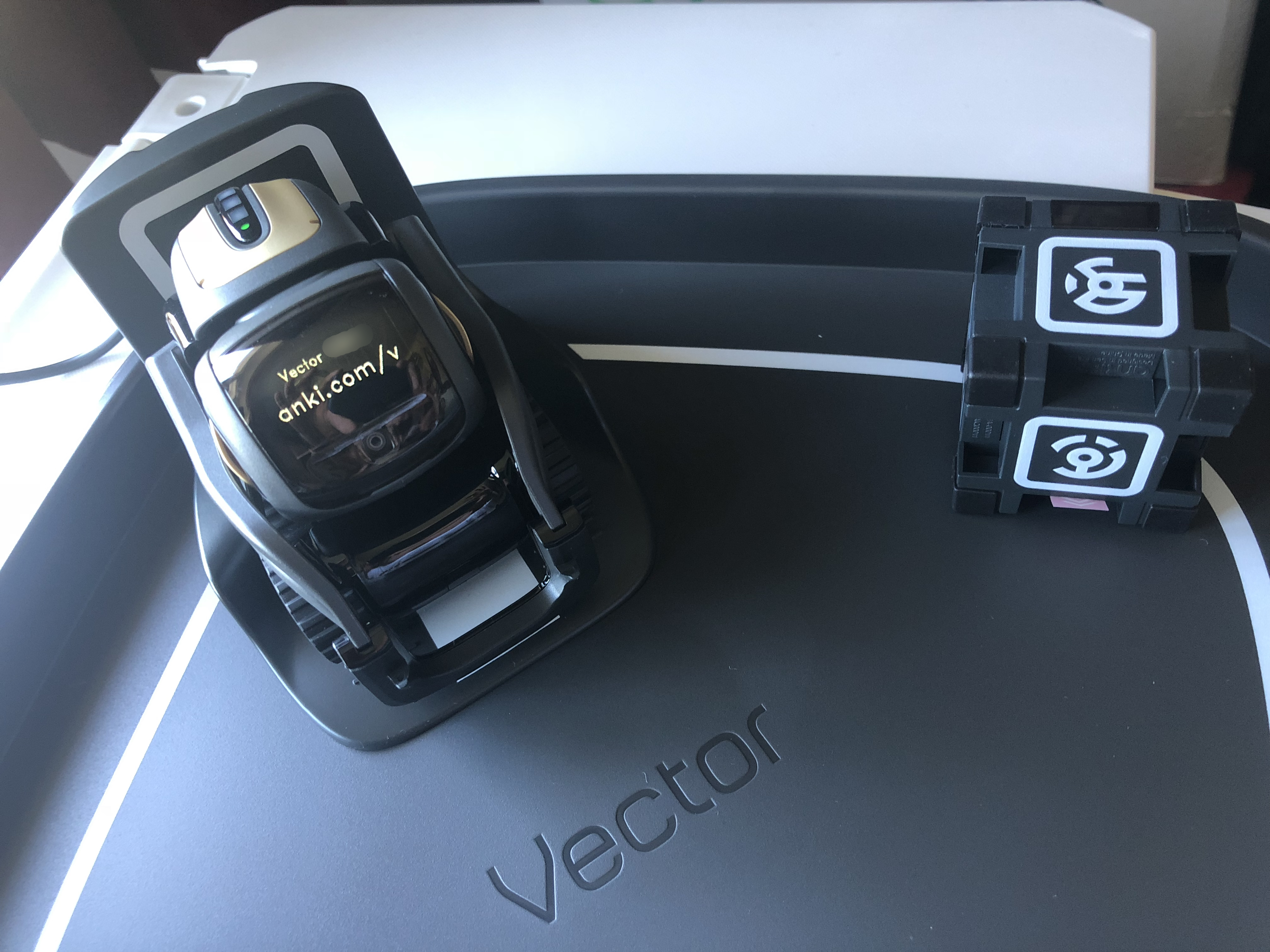
Vector, which has a similar form factor to Cozmo

=== Vector ===
Anki released Vector, a successor to Cozmo, on October 12, 2018, after first being listed on the crowdfunding platform Kickstarter. Vector was intended to be more "adult-focused" than Cozmo, which was tailored more specifically to children.

Unlike Cozmo, Vector is able to respond to voice requests and provide information such as the current time or weather, and is more akin to a virtual assistant than a children's toy or an educational device. However, like Cozmo, Vector has a unique personality that builds off that of Cozmo. Palatucci said that, while developing Vector, the intention was to "work out how to bring a sci-fi character into a physical form".

Tappeiner said that Cozmo and Vector were created because of Anki being "interested in a future where humans and robots co-exist in people’s homes". Although Vector uses cloud technology, such as to receive updates, the developers made it a priority to have Vector only store data locally.

=== Derivative works ===
Cozmo's form factor and expressiveness have inspired many other robots, most notably Amazon's Astro and Keyi Tech's Loona.
