= Adobe Fuse CC =

3D computer graphics software

- Original author: Mixamo
- Developer: Adobe Systems
- Release: 27 March 2014; 12 years ago
- Stable release: 1.2 / 7 August 2014; 12 years ago
- Operating system: Mac OSX 10.8 or Win 7 and later
- Available in: English
- Website: www.adobe.com/products/fuse.html
- As of: November 2017

Adobe Fuse CC (formerly Fuse Character Creator) was a 3D computer graphics software developed by Mixamo that enables users to create 3D characters. Its main novelty is the ability to import and integrate user-generated content into the character creator. Fuse was part of Mixamo's product suite, and it is aimed at video game developers, video game modders, and 3D enthusiasts.

== History ==
The technology underneath Fuse was initially developed as a character creator at Stanford University from the work of Siddhartha Chaudhuri in Prof. Vladlen Koltun's group. Chaudhuri's work resulted in a SIGGRAPH publication in 2011. Mixamo also partnered with Allegorithmic in the creation of Fuse. All texturing within Fuse is driven by Allegorithmic's Substance Designer. A beta version of Fuse was originally launched on Steam in November 2013. Fuse 1.0 was officially launched in March 2014. Adobe has stopped development and discontinued support for Fuse on September 13, 2020.

== Software ==
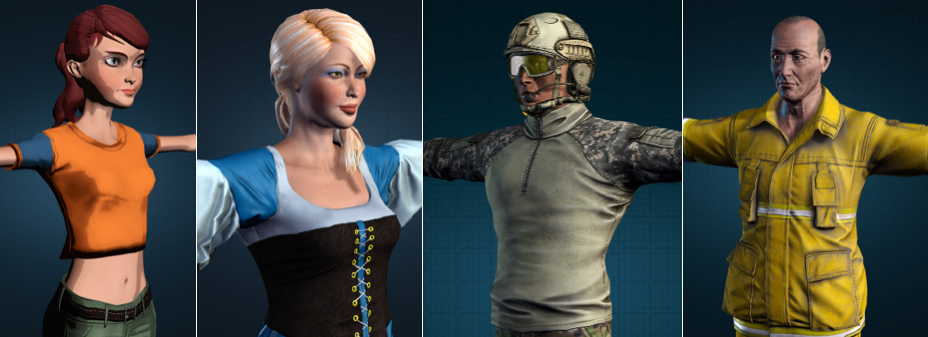
Models created with Fuse.

Fuse is a client based product that lets users choose and modify character components such as body parts in real-time. Users can also customize their characters with clothing and texture options provided by Allegorithmic. Fuse's main novelty is the ability for users to import and automatically integrate their own content into the character creation system, leveraging all the features of pre-loaded content. Fuse characters are rigged through Mixamo online service. Characters have a bone driven rig and a blend shape based facial rig for facial animation.

== Availability ==
Fuse is used mostly by game developers and game modders. Fuse is available on Mixamo, on the Unity Asset Store and on Steam marketplace where it has a user base of 40,000 users as of September 2014. Fuse characters can be imported through a specific series of steps into games created with the Source SDK by Valve.

== License ==
All content available within Fuse is royalty free and regulated by the Fuse End User Licensing Agreement.
