= Gradescope =

American educational technology company

Gradescope, Inc.
- Company type: Subsidiary, private
- Founded: 2014; 12 years ago Berkeley, California, U.S.
- Headquarters: Berkeley, California, {{{location_country}}}
- Area served: United States
- Key people: Pieter Abbeel; Arjun Singh; Ibrahim Awwal; Sergey Karayev
- Industry: Education
- Website: www.gradescope.com

Gradescope (stylized as gradescope) is an American ed-tech company that offers online and AI-assisted grading tools for higher education. Founded in 2014, the company is headquartered in Berkeley, California. The company's grading software offers tools for grading written exams, homework assignments, and auto-grading submitted code. As of the 2020 school year Gradescope stated that over "25,000 educators" used their product.

In 2018, Gradescope announced it was being purchased by Turnitin for an undisclosed sum.

In response to the COVID-19 pandemic and many students taking classes from home, Gradescope released a LockDown Browser that prevented a user's device from visiting other sites while taking an online exam. The feature, though still in beta, was made available to academic institutions with an institutional site license on a request-only basis.
