= Karol Hausman =

Computer scientist and robotics researcher

- Occupations: Computer scientist, robotics researcher
- Employer: Stanford University
- Organization: Physical Intelligence Inc.
- Known for: Robot learning, simulation-to-real transfer, embodied AI

Academic background
- Education: University of Southern California (PhD); Technical University of Munich (MS); Warsaw University of Technology (MS, BS)

Academic work
- Discipline: Computer science
- Sub-discipline: Robotics, Artificial intelligence, Machine learning
- Institutions: Stanford University; Google Brain; Google DeepMind

Karol Hausman is a Polish professor, researcher and technology executive known for his work on robot learning and artificial intelligence.

== Early life ==
Hausman was born in a small city in Poland. He received a Ph.D. in Computer Science from the University of Southern California, a Master of Science in Robotics from the Technical University of Munich, a Master of Science and a Bachelor of Science in Mechatronics from the Warsaw University of Technology.

== Research career ==
Hausman's work is focused on creating an AI that can power any robot. He has been serving as an adjunct professor at Stanford University since 2021. He researched perception–action loops and interactive perception, showing how robots can actively move to reduce uncertainty in object pose estimation by coupling probabilistic state estimation with control.

In Scaling Simulation-to-Real Transfer by Learning a Latent Space of Robot Skills, published in The International Journal of Robotics Research (2020), Hausman and collaborators proposed learning a low-dimensional latent space of skills in simulation and adapting them efficiently to physical robots. The method improved transfer efficiency and reduced the amount of real-world data required for locomotion and manipulation tasks.

At Google Brain and Google DeepMind, he worked as a senior researcher on large-scale robotic learning systems that trained generalizable grasping and manipulation policies from extensive robot interaction data. His work emphasizes shared representations and scalable learning architectures for general-purpose robotic intelligence.

He served as an chair/associate editor of the International Conference on Robotics and Automation, International Conference on Learning Representations, Neural Information Processing Systems, International Conference on Machine Learning.

=== Physical Intelligence ===
Hausman co-founded Physical Intelligence, a technology company that aims to develop foundation models and learning algorithms for physically embodied AI systems.
