= Rimmer =

Rimmer is a surname. Notable people with the surname include:

- Anne Rimmer (born 1947), New Zealand conservationist and writer
- Douglas Rimmer (1927–2004), political economist and Africanist
- Eve Rimmer (1937–1996), New Zealand athlete
- Jimmy Rimmer, English footballer
- Jodie Rimmer (born 1974), New Zealand voice and performer actress
- John Rimmer (1878–1962), British athlete
- Lasse Rimmer (born 1972), Danish entertainer
- Marie Rimmer, British Labour Party politician, Member of Parliament (MP) for St Helens South and Whiston May 2015
- Michael Rimmer (born 1986), English middle-distance runner
- Robert Rimmer, author of The Harrad Experiment
- Schuyler Rimmer, American basketball player and coach
- Shane Rimmer (1929–2019), Canadian actor
- Simon Rimmer (born 1962), English celebrity chef and television presenter
- William Rimmer, English-born American artist
- William Rimmer (music), English composer of brass band music

Fictional characters:

- Arnold Rimmer, a fictional character in the BBC sitcom Red Dwarf
- Michael Rimmer, fictional anti-hero of the film The Rise and Rise of Michael Rimmer

== See also ==
- Glass rimmer, a bar accessory
- Rimer (disambiguation)
