= Covariant (company) =

American artificial intelligence and robotics technology company

- Type: Private
- Industry: Artificial intelligence; Robotics
- Founded: 2017; 9 years ago
- Founders: Pieter Abbeel; Peter Chen; Rocky Duan; Tianhao Zhang
- Headquarters: Emeryville, California
- Key people: Peter Chen (CEO); Rocky Duan (CTO); Pieter Abbeel (president and chief scientist)
- Website: covariant.ai

Covariant (formerly Embodied Intelligence) is an American artificial intelligence and robotics technology company. It is headquartered in Emeryville, California.

== History ==
The company was founded in 2017, under the name Embodied Intelligence, by Pieter Abbeel, Peter Chen, Rocky Duan, and Tianhao Zhang. Chen serves as CEO, Abbeel as president and chief scientist, and Duan as chief technology officer. Since 2008, Abbeel has been director of the Robot Learning Lab at the University of California, Berkeley, where he is also a professor. Chen, Duan, and Zhang are his former students at the university. Abbeel, Chen and Duan worked together as researchers with OpenAI, and Zhang was formerly a researcher with Microsoft.

Their purpose in starting the company was to bring an advanced level of robotic automation to factories and warehouses, by building software to enable existing robot hardware to handle a wider range of tasks through a hybrid system of imitation learning and reinforcement learning.

Building upon their research at Berkeley, the founders spent more than two years designing the Covariant Brain, AI-driven software that powers a robotic arm, enabling it to perform labor in a warehouse. In 2018, the company began collecting data from 30 variations of robot arms in warehouses around the world, all of which ran using the Covariant Brain. The company has since built up a database of billions of units of real-world robotics information.

In February 2020, it was announced that industrial robotics maker ABB would be partnering with Covariant to create robots for warehouses. Shortly after, automation company Knapp announced they would use Covariant's AI-for-robotics system, the Covariant Brain, at a warehouse it operates for German electrical supplies wholesaler Obeta. In 2023, logistics provider Radial implemented the Covariant Brain for robotic order sortation, and German e-commerce retailer Otto Group announced the integration of Covariant's technology for item induction.

On March 11, 2024, Covariant announced the launch of RFM-1 (Robotics Foundation Model 1), described as a robotics foundation model giving robots a human-like ability to reason and understand its environment. The model is trained on text, images, videos, robot actions, and a range of numerical sensor readings captured by warehouse robots running the Covariant Brain.

The technology enables robots to learn how to manipulate objects, through the use of deep learning and reinforcement learning. Covariant's offerings include Covariant Brain-powered goods-to-person picking, kitting, depalletization, item induction, and order sortation. Their technology enables robot arms to pick and sort items from bins at rates exceeding human performance.

=== Funding ===
At its founding, the company was backed by $7 million in funding from Amplify Partners and other investors. On May 6, 2020, Covariant announced it had raised $40 million in a Series B funding round led by Index Ventures, after having raised $20 million in a series A round. On July 27, 2021, Covariant raised $80 million in Series C funding, and on April 4, 2023, the company raised an additional $75 million, bringing its total funding to $222 million.

=== 2024 Amazon Agreement and Zombie Company status ===
On August 30, 2024, Amazon announced that it had entered into an agreement with Covariant for a "non-exclusive" license to the company's technology, hiring 25% of Covariant's workforce at Amazon, and for Covariant founders Abbeel, Chen, and Duan to join Amazon.

It was later revealed in a 2025 whistleblower complaint to the Federal Trade Commission, Securities and Exchange Commission, and the Department of Justice that the price of this functional takeover agreement was $380 million with an additional $20 million final licensing payment due to Covariant one year after the deal closed. This was significantly less than the valuation placed on Covariant in its final funding round in 2023 of $625 million. Amazon allegedly structured the deal as a so-called reverse acquihire to avoid antitrust scrutiny by forgoing a total acquisition of Covariant and instead taking the core technology it wanted as well as hiring key Covariant personnel, which an Amazon spokeswoman when interviewed did not deny. Covariant's founders received substantial payouts while investors and rank-and-file employees had their equity stakes substantially diluted and received very little. Amazon also allegedly included heavy restrictions on future sales and licensing agreements Covariant could pursue under risk of financial penalties payable to Amazon. The complaint also claims that Covariant is a "zombie company" that only exists on paper to collect the final 2025 licensing payment specified in the reverse acquihire transaction.

Covariant has not published any updates to its website, LinkedIn, X, or YouTube account since the Amazon transaction was announced in August 2024.

== See also ==
- OpenAI
- Figure AI
- Reinforcement learning
