= Thrive Capital =

American venture capital firm

Thrive Capital Management, LLC

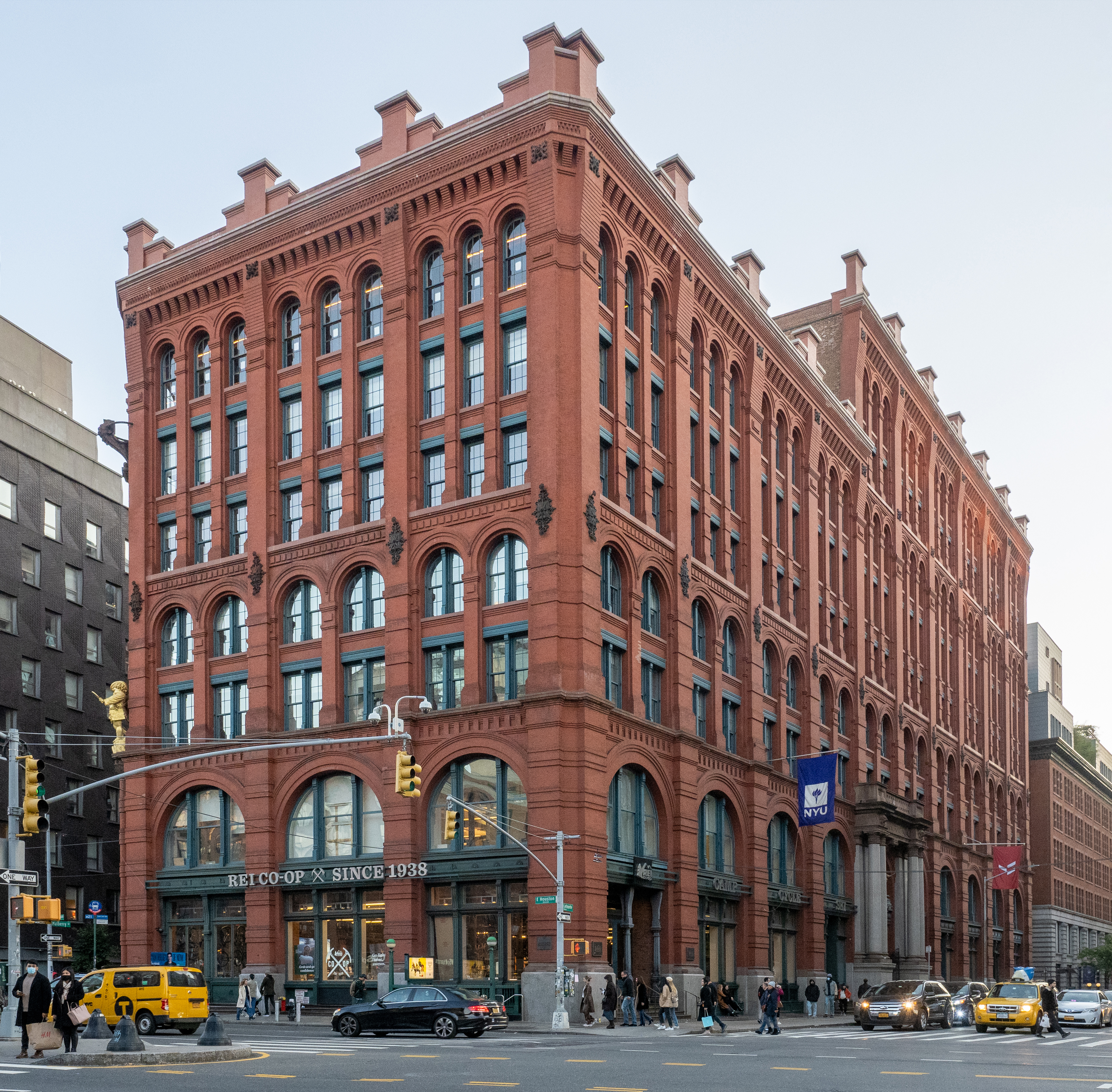
- Headquarters at Puck Building
- Type: Private
- Industry: Venture capital
- Founded: 2009; 17 years ago
- Founder: Joshua Kushner
- Headquarters: Puck Building, New York City, U.S.
- Key people: Nitin Nohria (executive chair)
- Products: Investments
- AUM: US$50 billion (2026)
- Owner: Joshua Kushner (96.7%)
- Number of employees: 64 (2024)
- Website: thrivecap.com

Thrive Capital Management, LLC, commonly Thrive Capital, is an American venture capital firm based in New York City. It focuses on software and internet investments. The firm was founded by Joshua Kushner, who is also a co-founder of Oscar Health and minority owner of the Miami Heat.

== History ==
Joshua Kushner founded Thrive Capital in 2009, at 24 years old. General Catalyst co-founder Joel Cutler provided the initial $5 million in seed money for the firm in 2010 as well as introduced investors to the firm and Kushner.

In 2011, the firm launched its first institutional fund, raising another $40 million from Princeton University, Wellcome Trust, Peter Thiel and other investors. General Catalyst served as the core LP yet again for this second funding round.

Following the 2016 United States presidential election, Jared Kushner was appointed as Senior Advisor to the President. Jared sold his entire Thrive Capital stake to avoid conflict of interest between him and the Trump administration.

In May 2021, Petershill Partners invested around $120 million in Thrive Capital for a 3% stake, which valued the firm at $4 billion. In September 2021, the firm registered as an investment adviser with the U.S. Securities and Exchange Commission. The firm stated as part of its regulatory filing that it planned to use some funds to invest in public companies and crypto assets. The same year, ten of Thrive's portfolio companies went public, including Affirm and Nubank. In 2022, Nitin Nohria, former dean of Harvard Business School, became the firm's first executive chairman.

In 2022, Thrive invested $130 million in OpenAI at a $29 billion valuation, the only term sheet the organization received at the time.

In January 2023, a group of five investors, Bob Iger, Mukesh Ambani, Henry Kravis, Xavier Niel and Jorge Paulo Lemann, acquired a 3.3% stake of Thrive Capital. This put Thrive at a $5.3 billion valuation - a 50% increase from when Goldman Sachs paid $175 million for the same stake in 2021. Thrive then raised $1.8 billion in March 2023 to invest into Stripe at a $50 billion valuation.

Thrive announced in August 2024 that it raised over $5 billion for Thrive IX, its biggest-ever set of funds and among the “largest completed this year by a venture firm.” The funds will be split between a $4 billion late-stage investment fund and a $1 billion fund dedicated to early-stage ventures.

The firm is noted for being an early investor in several high-profile technology platforms such as Instagram, GitHub, Spotify, Twitch, Physical Intelligence, and Anysphere. Thrive has also invested in Scale AI, A24, Stripe, Airtable, Glossier, Plaid, Anduril, Ramp, and Databricks.

In November 2024, Financial Times detailed how Thrive’s strategy is “investing heavily in fewer companies [to] provide a closer relationship with founders and more visibility into companies”; the firm is able to simultaneously “remain faithful to early-stage investing” while also participating in growth and late stage investments.

=== Thrive Eternal ===
Potential investors reportedly included Thrive Eternal, the permanent capital investment vehicle launched by Thrive Capital to pursue long-term ownership stakes in iconic franchises and cultural assets. In April 2026, Thrive Eternal acquired a stake in the San Francisco Giants of Major League Baseball.

On 28 July 2026, it was revealed that Thrive Eternal was expected to lead the investor group for FIFA Forward Enterprise, a proposed FIFA-controlled commercial entity intended to expand FIFA's commercial operations and unlock additional long-term investment. The group was reportedly expected to acquire around 20% of the entity through a minority, non-controlling stake, while FIFA would retain control over football governance and competitions.

== Funds ==
As of 2026, Thrive has raised a total of $22.3bn, and has over $50bn under management.

Fund	Vintage Year	Committed Capital ($m)
Thrive Capital Partners I	2009	5
Thrive Capital Partners II	2011	40
Thrive Capital Partners III	2012	150
Thrive Capital Partners IV	2014	400
Thrive Capital Partners V	2016	700
Thrive Capital Partners VI	2018	1,000
Thrive Capital Partners VII	2021	2,000
Thrive Capital Partners VIII	2022	3,000
Thrive Capital Partners IX	2024	5,000
Thrive Capital Partners X	2026	10,000+
