= TrialPay =

E-commerce payment system

- Company type: Private
- Industry: E-commerce, online retail, financial services
- Founded: 2006
- Headquarters: Mountain View, California, United States
- Key people: Alex Rampell, co-founder and CEO; Terry Angelos, co-founder & CPO; Eddie Lim, co-founder & CTO
- Products: Alternative payment platform, purchase incentives
- Website: www.visa.com

TrialPay is an alternative e-commerce payment system in which a customer gets an item for free from participating in exchange for buying or trying out another product or service from a TrialPay advertiser. The merchant is then paid for the item by the advertiser. TrialPay refers to this payment model as “Get It Free”.

The company works with online merchants in the software, social applications, casual games, online services, and retail industries, claiming to rely "on a web of business relationships to give consumers free goods, as long as they buy something else from a long list of well-known online stores.”

TrialPay's payment platform presents online shoppers with advertising offers as a way to pay for goods or services. Shoppers sign up for a trial or purchase a product from an advertiser to receive a free product. The system attempts to provide benefits for each party: online stores may make more sales from their current traffic, advertisers might acquire new customers on a pay-for-performance basis and shoppers get a free product with every purchase.

Financial Insights analyst Dana Gould says, “This is a [...] unique animal. [S]ince these offers come at exit points, companies are saving lost sales.” PC World analyst Yardena Arar, however, noted that the service made her feel like it encouraged people "to get products they don't need by trying out other products they don't need." She also found that in some cases the company exaggerated the actual benefits a consumer would receive.

On February 27, 2015, Visa Inc. announced its acquisition of TrialPay. In a press release detailing the acquisition, Visa described TrialPay as "a simple, cost-effective way to help merchants acquire customers, drive traffic, and increase sales by reaching Visa cardholders with targeted offers." Visa branded this service the Visa-Commerce Network.
