= Kirk Rimer =

American businessman

- Education: University of Missouri and Southern Methodist University
- Occupation: Investment manager
- Spouse: Jane Meredith Lewis (m. 1982)

Kirk Rimer is an American businessman who in 2011 was a managing director of Crow Holdings Capital Investment Partners where he was responsible for the oversight of non-real estate assets and was a managing director at Goldman Sachs between 1990 and 2010.

In January 1986, he received a United States Navy Achievement medal for participating in the Space Shuttle Challenger disaster recovery.

== Early years, education and Navy service ==
In 1977, Mr. Rimer was a United States Naval ROTC Scholarship Recipient at the University of Missouri. He graduated from the University of Missouri with a B.A. in Political Science. He earned his M.B.A. from Southern Methodist University's Cox School of Business in 1989.

From 1979 to 1988, Rimer was a naval aviator with the United States Navy for nine years. He received his designation as a United States Naval Aviator and received his US Navy Wings in 1982 after graduating top of his flight school class. In January 1986, he received a United States Navy Achievement medal for participating in the NASA Challenger Shuttle Disaster recovery.

== Career ==
Prior to joining Crow Holdings Capital in January 2011, Rimer was a managing director at Goldman Sachs and the Southwest Regional Manager for the Private Wealth Management Division in Texas.

He worked for Goldman Sachs for 20 years (from 1990 to 2010), focusing on risk management and equity investments, and was promoted to managing director of Goldman Sachs in October 2002.

== Community service ==
In 1993, Mr. Rimer founded the non-profit Time for Dallas, a young professional volunteer organization. In 1994, he received the Future Leader of Dallas award from the Dallas Junior Chamber of Commerce.

Rimer became a trustee of Austin College in Sherman, Texas.

He is the Chairman of the Don Jackson Center for Financial Studies at Southern Methodist University and he sits on the executive board for SMU's Cox School of Business. He is also a Director for the Baylor Health Care System Foundation. He is a Director on the advisory board for Shatterproof.

In February 2016, Mr. Rimer joined the board of directors for Goodwill Industries of Dallas, Inc.

== Personal life ==
Rimer has been married to Jane Meredith Lewis since 1982.
