= Pieter Abbeel =

Machine learning researcher at Berkeley

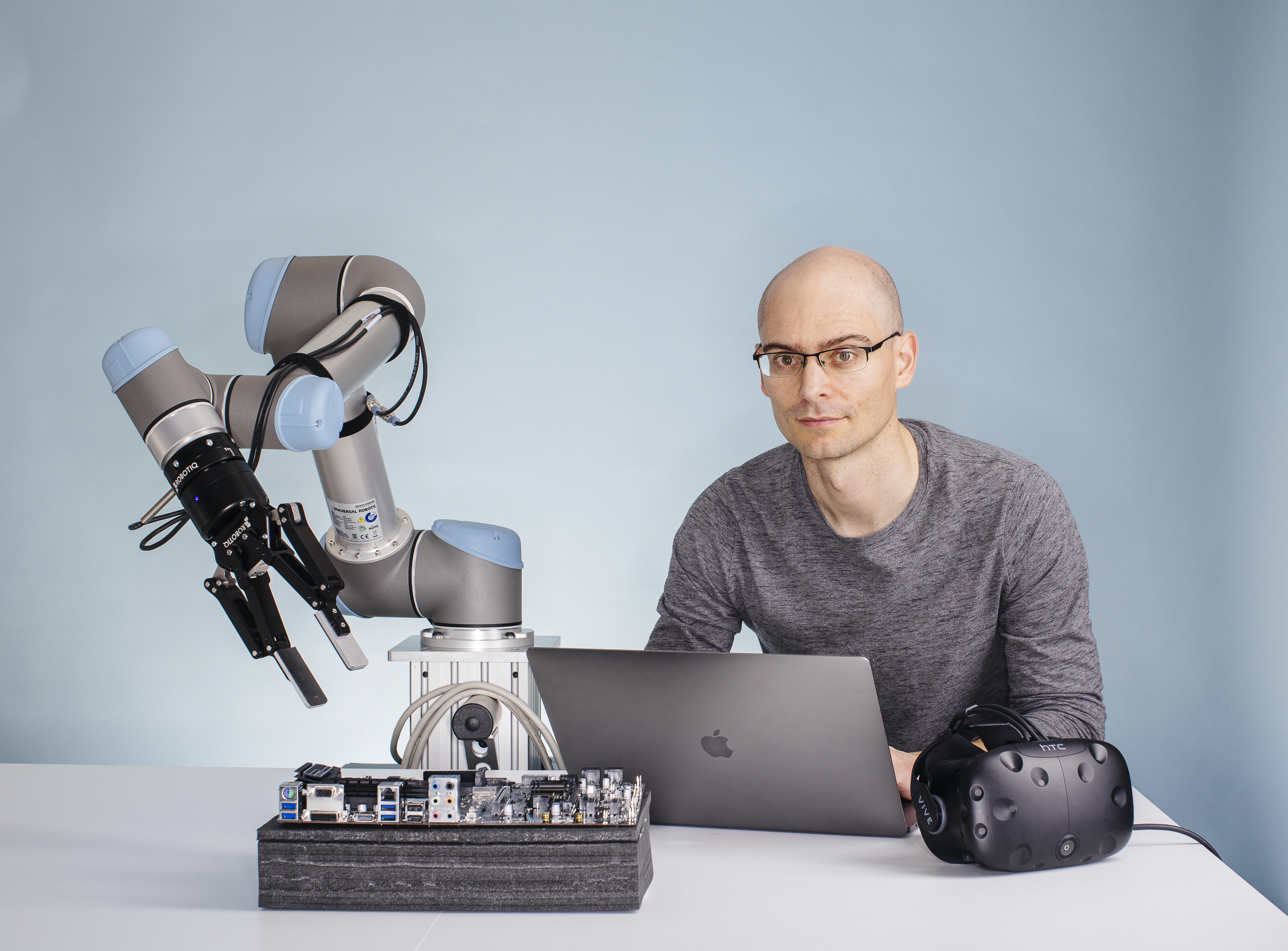
- Born: 1977 (age 48–49); Antwerp, Belgium
- Education: KU Leuven (BS, MS); Stanford University (PhD)
- Scientific career
- Fields: Artificial intelligence, machine learning, deep reinforcement learning, robotics, unsupervised learning
- Institutions: University of California, Berkeley; Gradescope; Covariant.AI; Amazon
- Thesis: Apprenticeship learning and reinforcement learning with application to robotic control (2008)
- Doctoral advisor: Andrew Ng
- Doctoral students: Chelsea Finn; John Schulman; Aravind Srinivas

Pieter Abbeel (born 1977) is a professor of electrical engineering and computer sciences, Director of the Berkeley Robot Learning Lab, and co-director of the Berkeley AI Research (BAIR) Lab at the University of California, Berkeley. He is also the co-founder of Covariant, a venture-funded start-up that aims to teach robots new, complex skills, and co-founder of Gradescope, an online grading system that has been implemented in over 500 universities across the United States. He is best known for his cutting-edge research in robotics and machine learning, particularly in deep reinforcement learning. In 2021, he joined AIX Ventures as an Investment Partner. AIX Ventures is a venture capital fund that invests in artificial intelligence startups.

== Early life and education ==
Abbeel was born in Antwerp, Belgium, in 1977. He grew up in nearby suburb Brasschaat.

As a high school student at Sint-Michielscollege (Brasschaat), Abbeel played on the club basketball team. He went on to play on the basketball team of KU Leuven University, where he obtained a Bachelor of Science and Master of Science in electrical engineering in 2000.

Abbeel received his Ph.D. in computer science from Stanford University. He specialized in artificial intelligence research, noting that his interest in AI sparked from the realization that AI can help build tools for other disciplines and that intelligence sets humans apart from other species. Originally, Abbeel intended to pursue a master's degree in computer science, but decided to stay for his Ph.D. due to the abundance of AI projects happening at Stanford. He was the first PhD student of AI Professor Andrew Ng, who was a first-year professor at Stanford at the time. After finishing his Ph.D. in 2008, Abbeel became an assistant professor in Berkeley's electrical engineering and computer science department.

== Career ==
Upon his arrival at UC Berkeley as an assistant professor, Abbeel founded the Berkeley Robot Learning Lab. Additionally, in 2014, he co-founded Gradescope with other UC Berkeley-affiliated engineers Arjun Singh, Sergey Karayev, Ibrahim Awwal, which was acquired by TurnItIn in 2018. In 2016, Abbeel joined OpenAI, where he has published numerous articles on reinforcement learning, robot learning, and unsupervised learning. Also in 2016, he became co-director of the Berkeley Artificial Intelligence Research (BAIR) Lab, which consists of post-doctoral, graduate, and undergraduate students interested in machine learning and robotics. He also founded Berkeley Open Arms, which has licenses the IP on the Blue Robot project from Berkeley. In 2017, he became a full-time professor with tenure at UC Berkeley.

In October 2017, Abbeel and three of his students, Peter Chen, Rocky Duan, and Tianhao Zhang, co-founded Covariant (formerly named Embodied Intelligence). Based in Emeryville, California, Covariant launched in January 2020 and was covered in, among others, New York Times, Wired, MIT Technology Review, and IEEE Spectrum. The company currently has $147M in funding. The website discloses that the team is building a universal AI to help robots see, reason, and on the world around them using deep imitation learning and deep reinforcement learning. Currently, in addition to his research, Abbeel teaches upper-division and graduate classes on Artificial Intelligence, Robotics, and Deep Unsupervised Learning. Abbeel also hosts a weekly podcast, The Robot Brains, featuring experts in AI and robotics.

Abbeel joined Amazon in August 2024, when it agreed to license Covariant's robotics foundation models and hire the company's founders. In December 2025, Abbeel was appointed head of Amazon's large language model efforts within the AGI organization, while continuing his work on robotics.
