= Mixamo =

Technology company

Mixamo Inc.
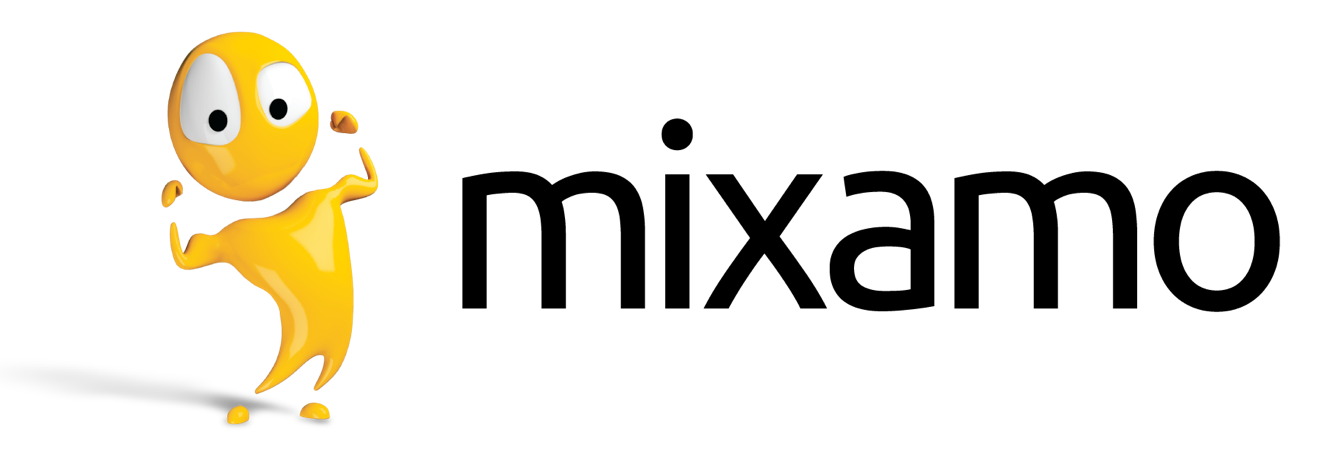
- Type: Subsidiary
- Industry: Interactive entertainment
- Founded: 2008; 18 years ago
- Founder: Stefano Corazza; Nazim Kareemi
- Headquarters: San Francisco, California, United States
- Number of employees: 20
- Parent: Adobe Inc.
- Website: www.mixamo.com

Mixamo Inc. (/ˈmɪksəmoʊ/) is a 3D computer graphics technology company. Based in San Francisco, the company develops and sells web-based services for 3D character animation. Mixamo's technologies use machine learning methods to automate the steps of the character animation process, including 3D modeling to rigging and 3D animation.

Mixamo is spun-off of Stanford University and has raised over $11 million from investors Granite Ventures, Keynote Ventures, Stanford University and AMD Ventures. Mixamo was acquired by Adobe Systems in 2015.

== History ==
Mixamo was founded in 2008 by Stefano Corazza and Nazim Kareemi as a spin-off of Stanford University's Biomotion Lab, and started out as a cloud-based service offering animations and automatic character rigging. It launched its first online animation service in 2009. In 2010, Mixamo worked with Evolver to provide characters to customers. Later Autodesk acquired Evolver and made it proprietary, but Mixamo had already begun work on its own character creation service.

Mixamo released its automatic rigging service in 2011. That was followed by the launch of its real-time facial animation product, Face Plus, in 2013, and the official launch of its Fuse 3D character creator software in March 2014. In August 2014, Mixamo launched a new pricing structure.

Mixamo was acquired by Adobe Systems on 1 June 2015.

== Fuse ==
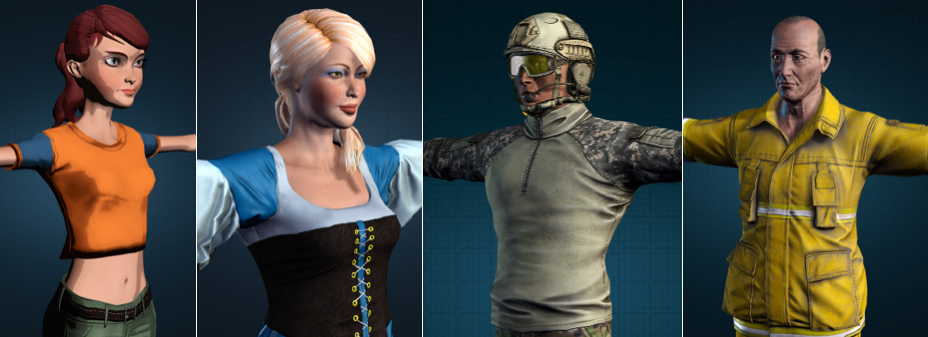
Models created with Fuse

In March 2014, Mixamo officially launched Fuse Character Creator at Game Developers Conference. Fuse stems out of the research done by Siddhartha Chaudhuri which originated within Vladlen Koltun's research group at Stanford and Substance technology from Allegorithmic. An early version of the service had been released in November 2013.

It allows users to create a 3D character by assembling customizable body parts, clothing and textures together. Those characters can then be exported into other 3D model software packages or game engine.

In March 2014, Mixamo launched Fuse 1.0 on Steam with the ability of importing and integrating user generated content in the character creation system. Fuse was updated to allow the importation and editing of character models generated by Microsoft's Kinect 2.0 in August of that year.

Development of Fuse was discontinued in September 2019. On 13 September 2020, the program was removed from the Adobe Creative Cloud and is no longer available for download from Adobe. Version 1.3 is still available for download on the Steam Marketplace.

== Rigging service ==
This service has been discontinued for keeping custom 3D models and models uploaded via fuse CC on Adobe's servers. Users can still upload 3D models to the online auto rigging service and rig them, but they will not be kept. Mixamo also provides an online, automatic model rigging service known as the Auto-Rigger, which was the industry's first online rigging service. The AutoRigger applies machine learning to understand where the limbs of a 3D model are and to insert a "skeleton", or rig, into the 3D model as well as calculating the skinning weights.

== 3D character animation ==
Mixamo's online services include an animation store featuring downloadable 3D models, poses, and animation sequences. The animations were created at Mixamo using motion capture and polished by key frame animators. All Mixamo animations work with characters created in Fuse and/or rigged with Mixamo's AutoRigger.

== Real-time facial animation ==
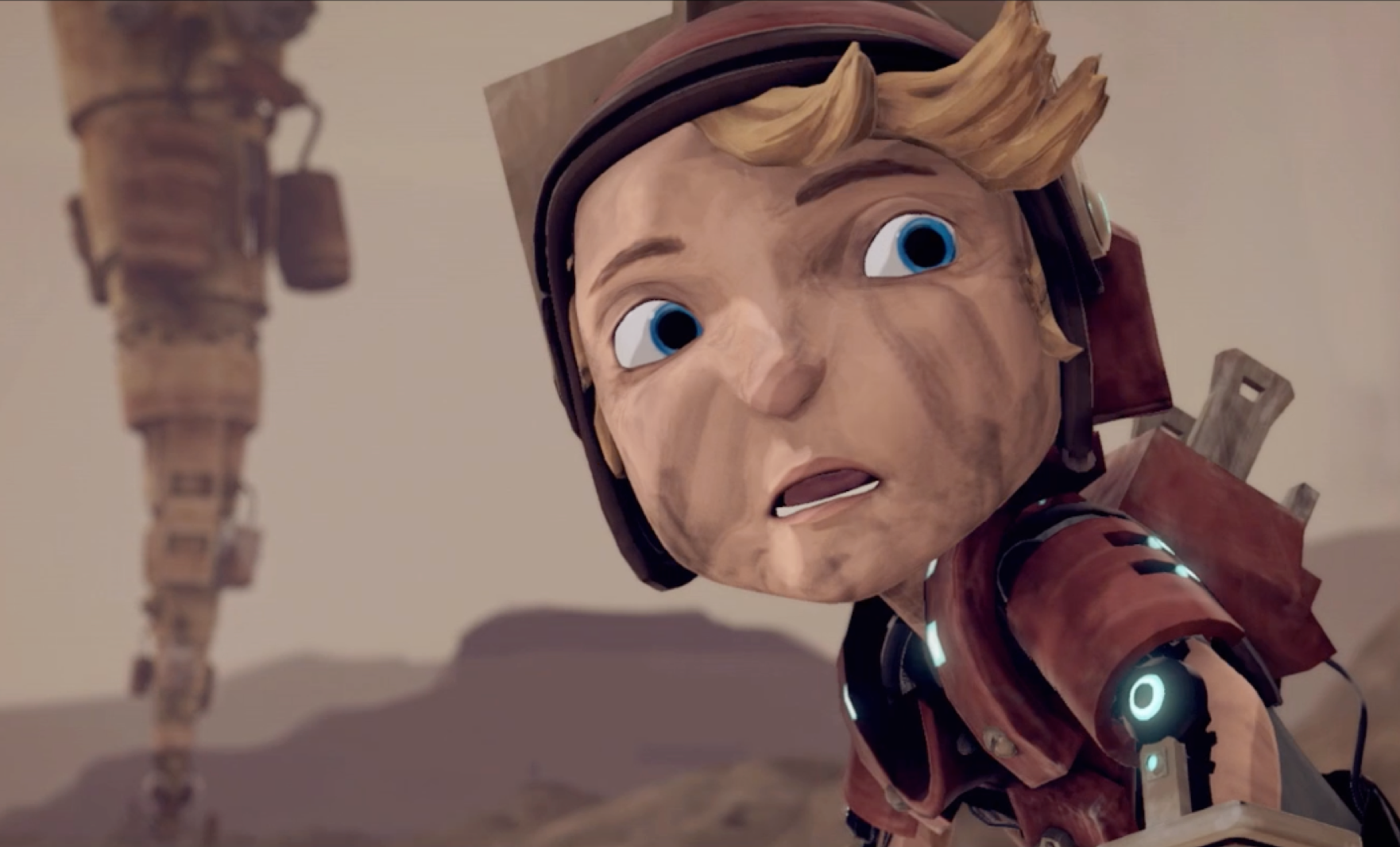
Screenshot from "Unplugged": real-time facial animation from single camera and blendshape animation running in Unity game engine

August 2013, Mixamo released Face Plus, a game development tool that allows users to record facial animation data of themselves using a standard webcam and apply the animation to a character inside the Unity game engine in real-time. Face Plus was briefly included in the keynote presentation at the Unite conference in Vancouver. The technology was developed in collaboration with AMD. and uses GPU acceleration.

The animated short "Unplugged" was created using Face Plus technology and as of April 2014 has won several awards.

Face Plus has been discontinued and according to a September 2017 Adobe Forum post by Adobe staff JMathews, no further work on the product was being contemplated at that time.
