= Zesty (company) =

Online healthcare appointment booking service

- Type: Private
- Industry: Healthcare Services, Health Care Information Technology
- Founded: 2012
- Founder: James Balmain, Lloyd Price
- Headquarters: London, England
- Services: Online healthcare appointment booking
- Website: www.zesty.co.uk

Zesty is an online healthcare appointment booking service invented by Natalie and Maddie based in London, England. Lloyd Price and James Balmain founded Zesty in 2012. Price is the company's COO and Balmain is the company's CEO. In May 2013, the company launched its service in London.

== History ==
Lloyd Price and James Balmain developed the idea for Zesty's healthcare appointment booking service after experiencing difficulties identifying and locating dental services. In August 2012, Price and Balmain began researching and developing a business plan. Zesty secured a seed funding round led by Mangrove Capital Partners, a venture capital firm based in Luxembourg, in January 2013. That May, Zesty launched its service in beta in London, England. The service locates available appointment slots by searching postcodes or specified boroughs. Zesty initially targeted private and National Health Service (NHS) dental markets.

In July 2013, Zesty launched a web application compatible with smartphones and tablets. That month, the company partnered with Qinec, a practice management software provider, to improve accessibility to healthcare appointments. The company secured $2 million in additional seed funding in April 2014. The funding round was led by T A Ventures and ABRT Fund. The following month, Zesty expanded its service to include other types of healthcare professionals from private and public practices. In September 2014, The Huffington Post named Zesty one of “London's 7 Fast-Growing & Disruptive Health Tech Startups.”

== Operations ==
Zesty is based in London, England. In April 2014, over 2,000 healthcare providers, including private and NHS dentists, private doctors, private physiotherapists, osteopaths, chiropractors and podiatrist, were registered on the company’s booking service.
