= Neil Rimer =

Swiss-Canadian venture capitalist

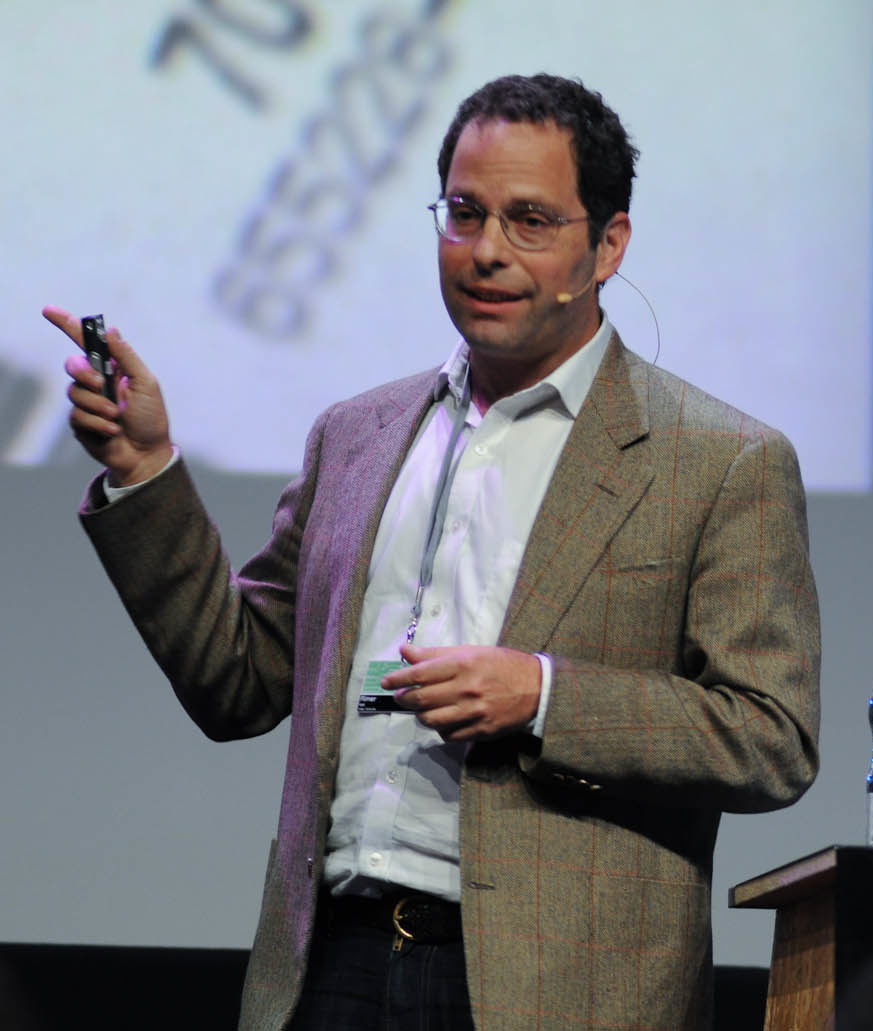
- Born: October 7, 1963 (age 63); Montreal, Quebec, Canada
- Education: Stanford University; Harvard Business School
- Occupations: Venture capitalist and investor, founder and partner at Index Ventures

Neil Rimer is a Swiss-Canadian venture capitalist who is the founding partner at Index Ventures, a venture capital firm that invests in Europe, the United States, and Israel. He is also the co-chair of the board of directors at Human Rights Watch.

== Early life and education ==
Rimer was born in Montreal, Quebec, and reared and educated (International School of Geneva) in Geneva, Switzerland. He received a bachelor's degree in History and Economics from Stanford University, and was a General Course student at the London School of Economics.

He then took his first job out of school with Montgomery Securities, an investment bank in San Francisco. He then completed a Master of Business Administration degree from Harvard Business School, and upon graduating, chose to return to Europe.

He was later quoted by Fortune as reflecting on this move, "I was excited about the idea of participating in the birth of the VC industry in Europe".

== Career ==
Soon after his return to Geneva, in 1991, Rimer helped his father Gerald exit the bond trading business he had founded, and spent a few years connecting institutional investors with European technology startups, an effort that over time evolved into the official launch of Index Ventures. In 1996 Rimer co-founded Index Ventures in Geneva with his brother, David, and Giuseppe Zocco, helping raise Index' first pilot fund of $17 million, followed by a $180 million fund in 1998. Companies funded during this time include SCM Microsystems (now Identiv) and Virata, a chipmaker, which later entered into a $1.3 Billion merger with GlobeSpan. Index started investing in Israeli companies in 2003. As of 2007, Rimer claimed to The Wall Street Journal that "the bulk of our portfolio is in Europe and Israel."

Notable investments by Rimer's company include Betfair (LSE: BET) and Skype (acquired by eBay for $2.6 billion, later acquired by Microsoft for $8.5 billion). Index Ventures has invested in 21 Israeli companies, including MyHeritage, Outbrain, Lacoon, Adallom, Wiz, Capitolis, and Gong.io.

Rimer has also invested in and served on the boards of directors of Last.fm (acquired by CBS for $280 million), Ofoto (acquired by Kodak), Trolltech (acquired by Nokia for $153 million), Numerical Technologies (acquired by Synopsis for $250 million); Genmab (Nasdaq Copenhagen: GEN); and StepStone. Rimer currently sits on the board of directors of a number of companies including Call9, Funding Circle, HouseTrip, MOO Print, PhotoBox, StackExchange, Supercell, Kaggle, Metromile, and The Climate Corporation (acquired by Monsanto for approximately $1.1 billion).

Rimer headed the team at Index Ventures that led a $130 million funding round in Supercell, the subject of a May 6, 2013 Forbes article, "Is This the Fastest-Growing Game Company Ever?" In October 2013 Softbank and GungHo Online Entertainment acquired 51% of Supercell for $1.53 billion.

In November 2017 Rimer was concerned that, although Europe was on a path to significance, it could miss the opportunities to build huge companies such as Amazon, Facebook or Google, if it could not attract the required talent. In April 2020, Neil Rimer became a member of the Taxfix board.

== Awards ==
In 2017, Rimer was named the number one venture capitalist in Europe in Forbes' inaugural Midas List Europe. He was also featured on the Forbes Global Midas list in 2018 and the 2018 New York Times list of the top venture capitalists worldwide.

== Philanthropy and Non-Profit Involvement ==
Rimer is a member of the board of directors of Human Rights Watch (HRW), of which he became Co-Chair in 2019, and is a founder of the Geneva Committee of HRW which named Israel an "Apartheid State". He has also served on the European Leadership Council of Harvard Business School and on the board of U.C. Sampdoria, a football club competing in the Italian Serie A professional football league competition.

In January 2022, Neil Rimer, together with his father and brothers, donated $13 million to McGill University, for the modernization of the Leacock building and the setting up of the Institute for Indigenous Research and Knowledges. Rimer took the opportunity to highlight the lifelong impact the education at McGill had had on his parents.
