= Index Ventures =

European venture capital firm

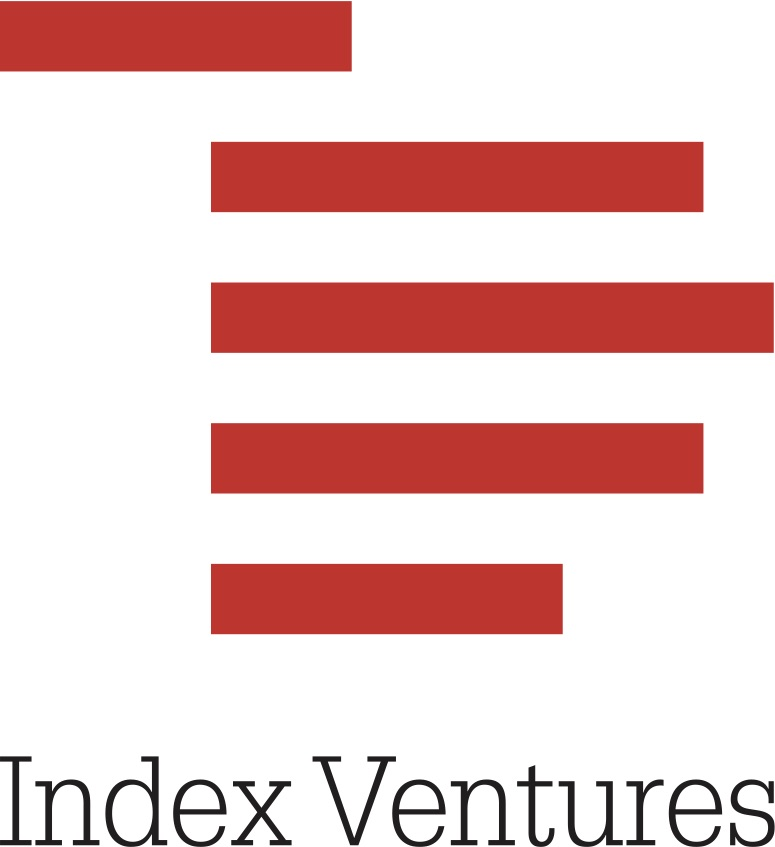
- Type: Private
- Industry: Venture capital
- Founded: 1996; 30 years ago in Geneva, Switzerland
- Founders: Neil Rimer, David Rimer, Giuseppe Zocco
- Headquarters: London, United Kingdom
- AUM: €11.7 billion (2025)
- Website: indexventures.com

Index Ventures is a European venture capital firm with headquarters in London and offices in San Francisco, New York City, Geneva and Jersey.

== History ==
Index Ventures has its origins in a Swiss bond-trading firm called Index Securities, founded by Gerald Rimer in 1976. In 1992, Rimer recruited his son Neil to join the firm, launching a technology investment arm that evolved into Index Ventures.

Index Ventures was officially founded in Geneva in 1996 by Neil Rimer, David Rimer and Giuseppe Zocco. The firm established its London office as its base in 2002. It began investing in Israel in 2003, and by 2005 raised €300 million for its third fund. Two years later, it raised an additional €350 million for its fourth fund, which focused 15 to 20 percent on investing in Israeli companies.

In 2012, Index closed its sixth fund, raising €350 million from limited partners to invest in technology startups across Europe, the U.S., and Israel.

“In 2014, Index Ventures announced a new early-stage fund of $550 million aimed at technology startups in Europe, the U.S., and Israel.

In 2017, it raised €400 million for its seventh fund, focusing on companies in Europe, the U.S., and Israel.

In 2021, Index Ventures raised a total of $3.1 billion across new funds, allocating $900 million to early-stage ventures, $2 billion to growth-stage investments, and an additional $200 million toward a seed fund. The firm also closed a second seed-focused fund of $300 million in 2022.

Having focused on technology and life sciences for its first two decades, the firm spun off its life sciences business in 2016 as Medicxi Ventures, an independent venture capital firm specializing in life-sciences investments.

Index Ventures' office in San Francisco was opened in 2011, as the firm expanded to the US. The firm has offices in Geneva and Jersey and opened a New York City office in 2022.
