= Adobe Shockwave =

Multimedia platform

- Developer(s): Adobe Inc., Macromedia, MacroMind
- Target platform(s): Web browsers, Windows, macOS
- Editor software: Adobe Director
- Player software: Shockwave Player
- Format(s): DIR, DCR, DXR
- Programming language(s): Lingo
- Application(s): Browser games, desktop apps, video games
- Status: Discontinued on April 9, 2019
- License: Proprietary
- Website: www.adobe.com/products/shockwaveplayer/

Adobe Shockwave (formerly Macromedia Shockwave and MacroMind Shockwave) is a discontinued multimedia platform for building interactive multimedia applications and video games. Developers originate content using Adobe Director and publish it on the Internet. Such content could be viewed in a web browser on any computer with the Shockwave Player plug-in installed. MacroMind originated the technology; Macromedia acquired MacroMind and developed it further, releasing Shockwave Player in 1995. Adobe then acquired Shockwave with Macromedia in 2005. Shockwave supports raster graphics, basic vector graphics, 3D graphics, audio, and an embedded scripting language called Lingo.

During the 1990s, Shockwave was a common format for CD-ROM projectors, kiosk presentations, and interactive video games, and dominated in interactive multimedia. Various graphic adventure games were developed with Shockwave then, including The Journeyman Project, Total Distortion, Eastern Mind: The Lost Souls of Tong Nou, Mia's Language Adventure, Mia's Science Adventure, and the Didi & Ditto series. Video game developers developed hundreds of free online video games using Shockwave, publishing them on websites such as Miniclip and Shockwave.com.

In July 2011, a survey found that Flash Player had 99% market penetration in desktop browsers in "mature markets" (United States, Canada, United Kingdom, France, Germany, Japan, Australia, and New Zealand), while Shockwave Player claimed only 41% in these markets. Adobe Flash and Adobe AIR are alternatives to Shockwave, with its 3D rendering capabilities, object-oriented programming language, and capacity to run as a native executable on multiple platforms.

In February 2019, Adobe announced that Adobe Shockwave, including the Shockwave Player, would be discontinued effective April 9, 2019.

== History ==
=== MacroMind ===
Shockwave originated with the VideoWorks application developed by MacroMind for the original Apple Macintosh. Animations were initially limited to the black and white of early Macintosh screens. VideoWorks was rebranded as Director 1.0 in 1987. Director 2.2 was released in 1988, and included the Lingo scripting language with extensibility provided by Xtras. A Windows version was available in the early 1990s. Director 3.0 was the last version by MacroMind, and released in 1989 which introduced XObjects to Lingo. Shockwave Player had still not been developed, and the sole means of publishing content remained generating executable applications.

=== Macromedia ===
In 1992, MacroMind (now MacroMind-Paracomp) merged with Authorware Inc. and became Macromedia. As the Internet became more popular, Macromedia realized the potential for a web-based multimedia platform, and designed Shockwave Player for the leading web browser of the time, Netscape Navigator. Shockwave Player was released with Director 4.0 around 1995, and branded Shockwave Player 1.0. Its versioning has since been tied to Director's versioning, skipping versions 2 to 4. Shockwave was now a two-part system, a graphics and animation editor known as Macromedia Director, and a player known as Macromedia Shockwave Player.

Macromedia Director quickly became the de facto production tool for the multimedia industry. By 1993 it was used to develop most Macintosh CD-ROM games, such as point-and-click graphic adventures. Throughout the 1990s Director was credited with the creation of the majority of educational CD-ROMs. It was preferred over competing applications due to its range of features, relative ease of use and Director's ability to publish executables for both Apple and Microsoft operating systems.

A less-sophisticated alternative to Director was Apple's HyperCard. From 1995 to 1997 a competing multimedia authoring program appeared called mTropolis (from mFactory). In 1997, mTropolis was purchased and discontinued by Quark, Inc., which had its own plans to get into multimedia authoring with Quark Immedia.

In December 1996, Macromedia acquired FutureWave Software and its FutureSplash products. Macromedia Flash 1.0 was released shortly thereafter. Macromedia now controlled two of the three leading multimedia platforms for the web, with Java being the third.

Macromedia Director 8.5 was released in 2001 and was the first version to specifically target the video game industry. It introduced 3D capabilities, 3D text, toon shading, Havok physics, Real Video, Real Audio, integration with Macromedia Flash 5, behaviors, and other enhancements. 3D modelling programs such as LightWave, Cinema 4D, and 3D Studio Max were upgraded to export 3D models for Shockwave.

As of 2001, over 200 million people had the Macromedia Shockwave Player installed, making Shockwave a common format for online video games. Websites such as Miniclip and Shockwave.com were dedicated to Shockwave and Flash-based video games.

=== Adobe ===
Macromedia was acquired by Adobe Systems in 2005, and the entire Macromedia product line including Flash, Dreamweaver, Director/Shockwave, and Authorware was now handled by Adobe. Director is currently developed and distributed by Adobe Systems.

The early 2000s saw a decline in the usage of Director/Shockwave as most multimedia professionals preferred Macromedia Flash and other competing platforms. After the Adobe acquisition, no new versions were released for four years.

In 2007, Adobe released Adobe Director 11, the first new release in four years. It introduced DirectX 9 native 3D rendering and the AGEIA PhysX physics engine, panel docking, QuickTime 7 support, Windows Media, RealPlayer support, Adobe Flash CS3 integration, and Unicode support. It was considered an "incremental release" by reviewers and the scripting editor was still considered "primitive".

As of 2008, the market position of Director/Shockwave overlapped with Flash to a high degree, the only advantage of Director being its native 3D capabilities. However, with the release of Flash Player 11, GPU-based 3D rendering was now supported using Stage3D (the underlying API), Away3D or Flare3D (3D game engines). And after Adobe AIR was released, Flash programs could now be published as native applications, further reducing the need for Director.

In February 2019, Adobe announced that Adobe Shockwave, including the Shockwave Player, would be discontinued in April 2019.

== Xtras ==
Xtras are plug-ins for the Lingo scripting language that enable additional functionality into a Shockwave project. Xtras are typically used to add file system I/O, hardware integration, and advanced multimedia functions. Xtras are supported and available for Adobe Director, Adobe Authorware and Adobe Freehand.

Many of Director's own functions are implemented as Xtras. Xtras use the Macromedia Open Architecture which was designed to allow easy creation of interchangeable components between Macromedia products. Adobe maintains a list of third party Xtras.

Xtras for Microsoft Windows (32-bit) have an .X32 file extension. Xtras for Mac OS generally have an .XTR extension. The file extension *.X16 is reserved for Xtras for Microsoft Windows (16-bit).

== See also ==
- Adobe Flash
- Adobe AIR
- Adobe Reader
- Microsoft XNA
- Microsoft Silverlight
