= Apple Media Tool =

The Apple Media Tool was a multimedia authoring tool and associated programming environment sold by Apple in the late 1990s. It was primarily aimed at producing multimedia presentations for distribution on CD-ROM and was aimed at graphic designers who did not have programming experience. It featured an advanced user interface with an object-oriented user model that made production of rich and complex presentations easy. Its competitors were Macromedia Director, Quark Immedia, mTropolis, and Kaleida Labs ScriptX.

== History ==
The AMT system was developed by Patrick Soquet, a developer in Belgium working for Arborescence - a French company that was later acquired by Havas. From 1993 onwards it was marketed by Apple but all development was done by the independent team led by Soquet. In 1996, the development of the tool was taken over by Apple and the 2.1 version of the program was developed in-house by a team of engineers in California led by Dan Crow. In 1997 Apple decided to concentrate its multimedia offerings on QuickTime and HyperCard and the rights to AMT returned to Havas. Patrick Soquet acquired these rights and co-founded Tribeworks and developed a new tool based on AML, called iShell.

== Features ==
The major features of the Apple Media Tool were a graphical authoring tool (AMT itself) and an associated programming environment - the Apple Media Tool Programming Environment (AMTPE) which was a compiler and debugger for the underlying Apple Media Language (AML - also known as the Key language). AMT was notable as one of the first authoring systems to support embedding Apple's pioneering QTVR movie format.

AML is an object-oriented programming language based on Eiffel but specialized for multimedia programming. Although the AMT did not require any programming experience to use, it produced complete AML programs which were then compiled into byte code and interpreted by a runtime interpreter. The AMPTE could be used to enhance the AML code to create more complex programs, for example accessing a database to retrieve media. AML is conceptually similar to Java, with a "write once, run anywhere" approach to cross-platform development: it had runtime interpreters for both the classic Mac OS and Windows platforms.

== Awards ==
- 1993 MacUser Editor's Choice Award for Best New Multimedia Software
