= Joe Sparks (video game developer) =

American programmer and animator

Joe Sparks is an American video game developer, animator, songwriter, web publisher, and multimedia consultant from San Francisco, California.

Sparks created the Radiskull and Devil Doll web-cartoons published on the Macromedia Shockwave website around 2000–01. Other published media includes the videogames Total Distortion and Spaceship Warlock.

== Career ==
Joe Sparks is a former guitarist of the Californian deathrock band Burning Image. As an original member of the band, he did attend reunion shows.

Joe Sparks was an early employee of Paracomp, which became Macromedia in 1992. He left to found Pop Rocket, which produced the video game Total Distortion. Pop Rocket folded in 1995, with Sparks returning to Macromedia in 1997 as a creative developer.

He currently works as a consultant and contractor for development and design, and speaks at industry conferences and educational events.
