= Mia's Reading Adventure: The Bugaboo Bugs =

2007 video game

- Cover Art
- Developer: Kutoka Interactive
- Publisher: Kutoka Interactive
- Series: Mia's Big Adventure Collection
- Engine: Macromedia Director
- Platforms: Windows, Macintosh
- Release: 2007
- Genre: Educational
- Modes: Adventure Mode, Activities Mode

Mia's Reading Adventure: The Bugaboo Bugs is the latest title of Mia's Big Adventure Collection software series created by Kutoka Interactive. Released in late 2007 in Canada and the United States, the game teaches reading to children between 5 and 9 years old.

== Adventure ==
The Bugaboos have landed in Mia's quiet and peaceful house. Their partying and careless behaviour threatens to attract the attention of the Big Feet (humans) who have the power to drive everyone away from their homes. The player helps Mia handle the Bugaboo case.

== Activities ==
The game's 12 educational activities teach associating images to words, adverbs, phonics, rhymes, spelling, sentence structure, vocabulary, reading comprehension, word recognition, etc.

== Critical reception ==
The game received positive reviews from Macworld, Dr. Toy, The Opinionated Parent, Casual Gamer Chick, Geek Parenting, Props & Pans, Lille Punkin' Reviews and others. Common Sense Media gave it five stars.

== Awards ==
The game received the Parents' Choice Gold Award for 2008 in the software category and was part of Dr. Toy's 100 Best Children's Products for 2008.
