= Osamu Sato =

Japanese digital artist, video game developer, photographer, and composer

- 佐藤理
- Born: April 14, 1960 (age 66); Kyoto, Japan
- Occupations: Digital artist; photographer; composer
- Website: www.osamusato.net

Osamu Sato (佐藤 理, Satō Osamu; born April 14, 1960) is a Japanese digital artist, video game developer, photographer, and composer. His first work was the ambient music album, Objectless (1983). His first work in the video game industry was Eastern Mind: The Lost Souls of Tong Nou, which first released in Japan for Classic Mac OS in 1994, and in North America for Microsoft Windows the following year. In 1998, Sato created and produced the PlayStation game LSD: Dream Emulator, for which he also contributed design work and composed the soundtrack. The game later became his most recognizable work outside of Japan.

== Personal life ==
Osamu Sato was born on April 14, 1960, in Kyoto, Japan. During his childhood, his father and grandfather, both of whom were photographers, had a profound influence on him. His father and grandfather's photography of Buddhist art also shaped his artistic vision, as seen throughout his creations. The experience of visiting the Osaka Expo '70 with his father left a deep impression on the 10-year-old Sato. Sato pursued his formal education at the Kyoto Institute of Design and the Kyoto Saga Art College. After completing his studies, he worked for Mos Advertising Co., Ltd. before transitioning to freelance work. In 1986, he established the Osamu Sato Design Office (OSD), which was rebranded as OutSide Directors Company (OSD) in 1988. Initially working as a graphic designer, Sato shifted his focus to game development in the 1990s. Currently, he is primarily engaged in artistic creation involving music and graphics.

== Works ==
=== Music ===
==== Albums ====
- 1983 – Objectless
- 1994 October 21 – Transmigration
- 1995 October 21 – Equal
- 1997 – Linen Sampler
- 1998 October 22 – Lucy in the Sky with Dynamites
- 1998 October 22 – LSD & Remixes
- 2001 July – Aura 20/07/01
- 2017 November 22 – Objectless: Classic Ambient Works and More
- 2017 – All Things Must Be Equal
- 2018 – LSD Revamped
- 2020 – Grateful in All Things
- 2020 April 10 – Collected Ambient Grooves 1993 – 2001
- 2020 October 21 – Transformed Collection
- 2022 – Root(s)
- 2023 November 12 – LSD Transformed New Fancy Tracks
- 2024 December 25 – Multiple Personality
- 2025 November 5 – Love Is Glamorous／Life Is Gorgeous (Collaboration with Tomohiko Gondo)

==== EPs ====
- 2020 November 17 – Experimental Demo Tapes

==== Singles ====
- 2020 April 15 – I Dub You
- 2020 October 21 – Done
- 2020 October 21 – Extra Sunrise/ 808 Ambient Mix
- 2020 November 17 – Bonus
- 2020 November 17 – Daimonji Espresso
- 2022 – Fax Factory (Yoshihiro Sawasaki Mix)
- 2024 December 7 – Outtakes

=== Software ===
==== Video games ====
- 1994 May 21 – Eastern Mind: The Lost Souls of Tong Nou (東脳, Tonnō) (PC)
- 1995 October 21 – Chu-Teng (中天, Chūten) (PC)
- 1997 March 14 – Rolypolys: The Quick Brown Fox Jumps Over the Lazy Dog (ローリーポーリーズの七転び八起き, Rolypolys no Nanakorobi Yaoki) lit. 'Rolypolys' Seven Tumbles, Eight Stand-Ups' (PC)
- 1997 November 21 – Banabana MK.1: Rolypolys World Tour (バナバナ一号 ローリーポーリーズの世界大冒険, Banabana Ichigō Rolypolys no Sekai Daibōken) (PC)
- 1998 October 22 – LSD: Dream Emulator (PS1)
- 1999 August 26 – Tokyo Planet Planetokio (東京惑星プラネトキオ, Tōkyō Wakusei Planetokio) (PS1)
- 2000 March 9 – Rhythm 'N' Face (リズムンフェイス, Rizumunfeisu) (PS1)

==== Apps ====
- 2010 April 23 – ●▲■ (マルサンカクシカク, Maru Sankaku Shikaku) (Mobile (iOS))
- 2010 April 23 – Pocket Montage (ポケット・モンタージュ, Poketto montāju) (Mobile (iOS))

=== Art books/zines ===
- 1991 – The Alphabetical Orgasm (Book)
- 1991 – Out Side Directors Company Limited: Corporate Identity and Works (Book)
- 1992 November 4 – Alphabetical Animals (Book)
- 1993 April 6 – Homosexual (Book)
- 1993 June 25 – The Art of Computer Designing: A Black and White Approach (Book)
- 2000 – Rhythm 'n' Face Supplementary Reader (Book)
- 2010 August 24 – Maru Sankaku Shikaku (Zine)
- 2015 July – Symmetric (Zine)
- 2015 – Photo (Zine)
- 2017 – All Things Must Be Equal (Book)
- 2020 – Grateful in All Things (Book)

=== Exhibitions ===
- 1991 – The Alphabetical Orgasm, Tokyo
- 1992 – The Alphabetical Orgasm, Kyoto
- 1992 – Anonymous Animals, Tokyo
- 1993 April 6–24 – Homosexual, Tierrart Gallery, Tokyo
- 1998 – Osamu Sato and LSD Expo, Tokyo
- 2017 – All Things Must Be Equal
- 2018 – LSD Revamped ~Neo Psychedelia~, Tokyo
- 2020 – Grateful in All Things, Tokyo
- 2022 – ROOT(S), Tokyo
- 2024 – MULTIPLE PERSONALITY, Rittor Base, Tokyo
- 2024 – MULTIPLE PERSONALITY, SOMSOC, Harajuku
- 2025 November 11–23 – OSAMU SATO EXHIBITION PART 1, Tanabe Gallery
- 2025 November 28-December 14 – OSAMU SATO EXHIBITION PART 2, SOMSOC, Harajuku

=== Videos ===
- 1994 – Compu Movie (VHS Tape)
- 1994 November 21 – The Esoteric Retina (Video CD)
- 2001 – The Alphabet (Macromedia Shockwave)

=== NFTs ===
- 2021-2022 – LSD Transformed
- 2022 October 22 – Root(s)
