= Mia's Math Adventure: Just in Time! =

2001 video game

Mia's Math Adventure
- Cover Art
- Developer: Kutoka Interactive
- Publisher: Kutoka Interactive
- Series: Mia's Big Adventure Collection
- Engine: Macromedia Director
- Platforms: Windows, Macintosh
- Release: 2001
- Genre: Educational
- Modes: Adventure Mode, Activities Mode

Mia's Math Adventure: Just in Time! is the third title of the Mia's Big Adventure Collection software series created by Kutoka Interactive. Released in 2001 in Canada and the United States, the game teaches mathematics to children between 6 and 10 years old.

== Adventure ==
Mia must travel back in time to prevent a terrible fire that has consumed her house. After helping Marty gather the parts to build a time-travelling machine, she returns to the past in order to discover the cause of the fire and prevent it from ever happening.

== Activities ==
The game's 12 educational activities teach arithmetic (addition, subtraction, multiplication and division) geometry (circle, square, rectangle, triangle, closed and broken lines) logic, place value, fractions, measures, etc.

== Critical reception ==
Mia's Math Adventure received positive reviews from the National Parenting Center, USA Today, MacAddict, ReviewCorner.com, Maccentral.com, Houston Chronicle, Chicago Parent, and Los Angeles Times.

== Reception ==
Reception

Review score
Publication	Score
Review Corner	5/5

Award
Publication	Award
Review Corner	Award of Excellence

The game received several awards from various organizations such as Parents' Choice, National Parenting Center, Coalition for Quality Children's Media and iParenting Media Award.
