= Mia's Big Adventure Collection =

- Genre: Edutainment
- Developer: Kutoka Interactive
- Publisher: Kutoka Interactive
- Platforms: Windows, Macintosh
- First release: Mia's Reading Adventure: The Search for Grandma's Remedy; 1998
- Latest release: Mia's Reading Adventure: The Bugaboo Bugs; 2007

Mia's Big Adventure Collection is an edutainment software series created in 1998 by Kutoka Interactive. The series consists in five subject-based titles for children in elementary school.

== Gameplay ==
In the introduction of each of Mia's adventures, the player is invited to help her on a quest. As the player progresses through the game, there are various educational activities.

The difficulty level set by the player at the beginning of the game corresponds to different and more challenging question sets. Optionally, the player may bypass the entire adventure part of the Mia game and enter straight into a menu of all educational activities.

Inside Mia's adventure, the character of Mia follows the player's cursor on the screen and reacts to certain objects in the scene when they are clicked on.

== Characters ==
Mice:

- Mia Mouse: The titular protagonist of the series. She is a feisty and clever English mouse who carries a skateboard in her backpack. She lives in the attic of an old Victorian house on Carrington Lane in London, England, where her family has lived for generations.
- Marty Mouse: He is Mia's best friend. He is a very smart kid who likes to read books and is a bit shy, especially around Mia.
- Miguel Mouse: He is a gifted mechanic from Mexico.
- Manfrid Mouse: He is Marty's father. He owns the General Store.
  - Mister Maurice is also what he is called
- Grandma Mimi

Rats:

- Romaine Rat: The antagonist of the series. He is a businessman who has a special passion and talent for accumulating Sparklies, the currency in Mia's world.
- Pompon Rat: He is Romaine Rat's left arm and the cousin of Nopompon Rat.
- Nopompon Rat: He is Romaine Rat's right arm and the cousin of Pompon Rat.
- Rango Rat is a tall rat introduced in the TV series
- Rufus Rat is a short rat introduced in the TV series

Bats:

- Dingbat is a little bat. He cannot fly.
- Biska Bat is a female bat introduced in the TV series

Others:

- Betty Bird: She is a woodpecker flying around the gossip in Mia's neighbourhood.
- Freddy Frog: He is an accident-prone friend of Mia who lives in a pond in the backyard of her house.
- Scary Spider

== Titles in the collection ==
=== Main series ===
- Mia's Reading Adventure: The Search for Grandma's Remedy (1998)
- Mia's Science Adventure: Romaine's New Hat (2000)
- Mia's Math Adventure: Just in Time! (2001)
- Mia's Language Adventure: The Kidnap Caper (2003)
- Mia's Reading Adventure: The Bugaboo Bugs (2007)

=== Other titles ===
- Click & Create With Mia: A Complete Creativity Studio (2002)
- Mia Sudoku (2008)
- Mia's Word Copter (2010)
- Mia: The Happy Helper - A Fun Learning Adventure App (2014)

== Technology ==
With the exception of Mia's Language Adventure, which uses Kutoka's own 2D engine, all Mia games were developed with the Macromedia (later Adobe Systems) Director multimedia application authoring platform.

The in-game 3D animations are made with Softimage 3D (and later XSI) before they are imported as sprites inside Director. The animated 3D cinematics are also made with Softimage's technology and exported as QuickTime movies.

== TV series ==
The franchise was announced in 2010 by Radio Canada and produced by Sardine Productions. After delay Cyber Group Studios with Spacetoon Media's participation released the TV series in 2014 in both French and English. Toonavision picked up the show by 2019.

== Awards ==
In addition to awards received by the individual titles in the collection, the whole Mia collection received a United Nations World Summit Award in 2003.
