= Adobe Shockwave Player =

Software plug-in for viewing multimedia and video games

- Original author: Macromedia
- Developer: Adobe Inc.
- Final release: 12.3.5.205 (Win) / March 15, 2019; 7 years ago
- Operating system: Microsoft Windows, macOS
- Platform: Web browsers
- Type: Multimedia Player / MIME type: application/x-director
- License: Freeware
- Website: helpx.adobe.com/shockwave/shockwave-end-of-life-faq.html

Adobe Shockwave Player (formerly Macromedia Shockwave Player, and also known as Shockwave for Director) is a discontinued software plug-in for web browsers enabling interaction with multimedia and video games created for the Adobe Shockwave platform on web pages. Content developed with Director and published on the Internet could be viewed on any computer with the freeware plug-in installed. First developed by Macromedia and released in 1995, it was later acquired along with other Macromedia assets by Adobe Systems in 2005.

Shockwave Player ran DCR files published by the Adobe Director environment. Shockwave Player supported raster graphics, basic vector graphics, 3D graphics, audio, and an embedded scripting language called Lingo. Hundreds of free online video games were developed using Shockwave, and published on websites such as Miniclip and Shockwave.com.

As of July 2011, a survey found that Flash Player had 99% market penetration in desktop browsers in "mature markets" (United States, Canada, United Kingdom, France, Germany, Japan, Australia, and New Zealand), while Shockwave Player claimed only 41% in these markets. Flash Player was used as an alternative to Shockwave Player, with its more advanced 3D rendering capabilities and object-oriented programming language. Flash Player cannot display Shockwave content, and Shockwave Player cannot display Flash content.

In February 2019, Adobe announced that Adobe Shockwave, including the Shockwave Player, would be discontinued in April 2019. The final update for Adobe Shockwave Player was released on March 15, 2019. Shockwave Player is no longer available for download (as of October 8, 2019), and most major web browsers blocked the Shockwave Player plug-in from being used upon its discontinuation.

== History ==
The Shockwave player was originally developed for the Netscape browser by Macromedia Director team members Harry Chesley, John Newlin, Sarah Allen, and Ken Day, influenced by a previous plug-in that Macromedia had created for Microsoft's Blackbird. Version 1.0 of Shockwave was released independent of Director 4 and its development schedule has coincided with the release of Director since version 5. Its version has since been tied to Director's, thus there were no Shockwave 2–4 releases.

Shockwave 1
The Shockwave plug-in for Netscape Navigator 2.0 was released in December 1995, along with the stand-alone Afterburner utility to compress Director files for Shockwave playback. The first large-scale multimedia site to use Shockwave was Intel's 25th Anniversary of the Microprocessor.

Shockwave 5
Afterburner is integrated into the Director 5.0 authoring tool as an Xtra.

Shockwave 6
Added support for Shockwave Audio (swa) which consisted of the emerging MP3 file format with some additional headers.

Shockwave 7
Added support for linked media, including images and casts.
Added support for Shockwave Multiuser Server.

Shockwave 8.5
Added support for Intel's 3D technologies, including rendering.

Shockwave 9
Planned but never came into fruition, installer for Shockwave 9 is just 8.5.1, adding compatibility for XP.

Shockwave 10
Last version to support Mac OS X 10.3 and lower, and Mac OS 9.

Shockwave 11
Added support for Intel-based Macs.

Shockwave 12

Shockwave 12.1
It is supported by 32-bit and 64-bit versions of Windows XP, Vista, 7, and 8. It has content made from previous versions as well as Director MX 2004. From version 12.1.5.155 Shockwave is supported in both Internet Explorer and Mozilla Firefox.

Shockwave 12.2
Last update for macOS before discontinuation.

Shockwave 12.3
Last update before overall discontinuation.

== Platform support ==
Shockwave was available as a plug-in for the classic Mac OS, macOS, and 32 bit Windows for most of its history. However, there was a notable break in support for the Macintosh between January 2006 (when Apple Inc. began the Mac transition to Intel processors based on the Intel Core Duo) and March 2008 (when Adobe Systems released Shockwave 11, the first version to run natively on Intel Macs).

Unlike Flash Player, Shockwave Player is not available for Linux or Solaris despite intense lobbying efforts. However, the Shockwave Player can be installed on Linux with CrossOver (or by running a Windows version of a supported browser in Wine with varying degrees of success). It is also possible to use Shockwave Player in the native Linux version of Firefox by using the Pipelight plugin (which is based on a modified version of Wine).

In 2017, the authoring tool for Shockwave content, Adobe Director, was discontinued on February 1; and the following month, Shockwave Player for macOS was officially discontinued. In February 2019, Adobe announced that Shockwave Player would be officially discontinued and unsupported on Microsoft Windows, the last OS that supported the Shockwave Player, effective April 9, 2019.

== Security ==
Some security experts advise users to uninstall Adobe Shockwave Player because "it bundles a component of Adobe Flash that is more than 15 months behind on security updates, and which can be used to backdoor virtually any computer running it", in the words of Brian Krebs. This opinion is based on research by Will Dormann, who goes on to say that Shockwave is architecturally flawed because it contains a separate version of the Flash runtime that is updated much less often than Flash itself. Additionally Krebs writes that "Shockwave has several modules that don't opt in to trivial exploit mitigation techniques built into Microsoft Windows, such as SafeSEH."

== Branding and name confusion ==
In an attempt to raise its brand profile, all Macromedia players prefixed Shockwave to their names in the late 1990s. Although this campaign was successful and helped establish Shockwave Flash as a multimedia plugin, Shockwave and Flash became more difficult to maintain as separate products. In 2005, Macromedia marketed three distinct browser player plugins under the brand names Macromedia Authorware, Macromedia Shockwave, and Macromedia Flash.

Macromedia also released a web browser plug-in for viewing Macromedia FreeHand files online. It was branded Macromedia Shockwave for FreeHand and displayed specially compressed .fhc Freehand files.

Later, with the acquisition of Macromedia, Adobe Systems slowly began to rebrand all products related to Shockwave.

== See also ==
- Adobe Flash
- Adobe AIR
- Adobe Reader
