= Lasica =

Lasica is a surname. Notable people with the surname include:

- J. D. Lasica, American entrepreneur, public speaker, and journalist
- Milan Lasica (1940–2021), Slovak comedian, actor, singer, writer, lyricist, and satirist
- Marko Lasica (born 1988), Montenegrin handball player
