= SPQR: The Empire's Darkest Hour =

1995 video game

- Developer: CyberSites
- Publisher: GT Interactive
- Designers: Eden Greig Muir; Rory O'Neill
- Programmer: Daniele Russo
- Artists: Vanessa Pineda; Damijan Saccio; Patrick Welsh
- Writer: Kate Rogin
- Composers: Andy Tallon; Adam Wolfensohn
- Engine: mTropolis
- Platforms: Windows, Mac OS
- Release: NA: July 1995; EU: July 9, 1997; JP: July 9, 1997
- Genre: Adventure
- Mode: Single-player

SPQR: The Empire's Darkest Hour, also known simply as SPQR, is a computer adventure game by American studio CyberSites and published in 1995 by GT Interactive. Set in Ancient Rome, the player must solve a number of puzzles to uncover a criminal who wants to destroy Rome.

== Gameplay ==
In SPQR: The Empire's Darkest Hour, players take on the role of a sleuth in Ancient Rome, tasked with preventing the city's destruction in 205 AD by an unknown saboteur called the Calamitus. Summoned by patron Cornelius—recently arrested during an imperial crackdown—players begin investigation from his office after escaping the sewers. Using a futuristic device called the Navitor, players explore Rome's streets and buildings remotely, searching for clues hidden in the journals of five suspects. These journals update over the course of a year in game time, offering insights into motives and agendas. Movement is restricted to predetermined paths displayed through still, photorealistic screens rather than free 3D navigation. Reading is central to progress, with dozens of screens of information and lengthy notebooks, making investigation more about absorbing text than interacting with characters or dynamic events.

== Plot ==
The player is an unnamed character, a friend of the inventor Cornelius who has been arrested. His arrest was on the suspicion that he is involved with the Calamitus, a figure who intends to destroy Rome. The game starts underneath Cornelius's workshop, and once the player has entered the workshop itself they receive a message about his arrest. The message also gives the names of five possible Calamiti:

- Lucius: A retired soldier who is now a private investigator. Whilst not investigating, he spends his days drinking in the wine shop below his flat.
- Verania: The head Vestal Virgin, who is thinking of retirement.
- Xanthus: One of Gordian's assistants who claims to be Greek, but is actually a barbarian.
- Sybil: A prophetess who runs a small stall, but later works for the Roman Emperor.
- Gordian: An architect who is using the spare money from projects to build his own temple.

The player is also told about the Navitor, a machine that allows them to wander around Rome in the comfort of the workshop. Once activated it can pick up objects and use them in other places, travel in time and view each of the suspects' diaries.

When the player has activated the Navitor, their first task is to find the suspects' diaries. After this, they automatically update. There are also quests each month, consisting of a screen shot. The player must find the location portrayed in the screen shot and complete a puzzle or task to gain more clues and/or an important object. The events in Rome can be read both through the diaries and in the city newspaper, and can often help with the month's quest. Occasionally, the Navitor will crash, and the player must fix one of the machines around the workshop in order to fix the Navitor itself. Each of the machines represents a season, and only the correct machine for the season can be fixed.

=== Quests and events ===
This is a list of the quests for each month and the goings-on as detailed in the suspects' diaries.

November: The quest for November shows a door with four cogs on it. Gordian's temple is struck by lightning and blows up, and the player has to rebuild the entrance using the crane at the building site. On completing this task the player can reach the door depicted in the quest, which turns out to be the entrance to Cornelius's workshop. However, the player does not yet know how to turn the cogs to unlock the door.

December: The December quest shows the door to a temple. The Saturnalia is this month, and during the festivities the Temple of Saturn is broken into. By using the Golden Milestone and a clue found on top of the Arch of Severus, the player can enter the Aerarium underneath the temple. The player can then use a key found in the Aerarium to enter the temple itself. Inside the temple is Lucius's symbol, as well as a scroll showing how to unlock the entrance to Cornelius's workshop.

=== Ending ===
Using Lucius's instructions, the player can enter Cornelius's workshop. On entering the workshop, however, the Navitor sees itself. The resulting paradox causes the Navitor to explode, although the player is unharmed. Amongst the debris are the five 'gifts' from each of the suspects, collected throughout the game, along with the initial of their owner. The player must now choose who they think is the Calamitus by clicking on their gift. On choosing a suspect, a short video will play where the suspect says how they would destroy Rome if they were Calamitus. The player must then use the chosen gift to foil their plans.

=== Characters ===
- Player: The character through which the player views the world.
- Cornelius: An inventor, whose contraptions often go wrong. These can be seen around the workshop.
- The suspects: They are not seen in the game, except in drawings in their diaries. Also, see above.
- Emperor Severus: Mentioned only in the diaries, the Emperor is not very popular.

== Development ==
The game was developed by CyberSites, a company that was founded in 1994 and was based in New York City. The company's founders were Columbia University architecture professors Eden Muir and Rory O'Neill. It was released on Pathfinder on July 10, 1995 and generated more than 12 million hits. A Windows and Mac version was released on December 16, 1996.

The setting of SPQR, the ancient Roman forum, was modeled and rendered in Softimage on Silicon Graphics workstations. The interactive game title was developed using the mTropolis multimedia programming application.

== Reception ==
Reception

Review scores
| Publication | Score |
|---|---|
| Computer Games Magazine | 3/5 |
| GameSpot | 5.6/10 |
| Inside Mac Games | 4/5 |

GameSpot said "If you're a patient gamer looking for a challenging adventure, you should give SPQR: The Empire's Darkest Hour a try. For others, all I can say is caveat emptor"

== Sales ==
By 1997, the game shipped 70,000 copies.
