= IShell =

Traditional multimedia authoring environment

iShell is a traditional multimedia authoring environment, similar in many ways to Macromedia Director. A descendant of the Apple Media Tool, iShell is designed to be easy to use, but powerful enough to grow as a user's skill set increases. iShell was first released by Tribeworks in 1999. In July 2006, tribalmedia acquired all rights to iShell. The current version of iShell is 4.5r7.

iShell uses the Key programming language, which is based on Eiffel. This language was previously known as the Apple Media Language (AML) which was part of the Apple Media Tool. Both iShell and the Apple Media Tool were developed by Patrick Soquet, one of the founders of Tribeworks. The two tools share many design features in common.

iShell differs in its distribution model from similar applications, allowing users access to the source code.

== Features ==
- Cross-platform creation and delivery (Macintosh and Windows)
- Graphical reusable object and event based programming and design environment
- Support and use of the QuickTime media framework
- Text support via basic RTF and HTML, and common styled input fields
- Pluggable architecture for the addition of external third-party plugins and scripts
- Access local and remote media assets
- XML creation and parsing through DOM and SAX
- Flat file text database support
- Common programming functions and logic for strings, numbers, etc. without the need for scripting

== Third-party plugins ==
Numerous developers have taken advantage of iShell's community-source model to build commercial plugins for the software. tribalmedia acts as a reseller for many of these third-party developers.

- Kromo: Adds several features to iShell, including database integration and filesystem functions.
- Spunk: A companion program to Kromo, allows developer to incorporate web-based content into iShell projects.
- ImageLayer: Full integration of Photoshop files.
- ZebraSpeak: Adds text-to-speech and advanced keyboard interaction to iShell.
- ZebraTools: Adds numerous new features to iShell.
- OpenTribe plugins: iSQUALE, DiSx, iStorm, iGDIP, iDream
