= John Thompson (inventor) =

American inventor and programmer (born 1959)

John Henry Michael "JT" Thompson (born June 15, 1959) is the inventor of the Lingo programming language used in Adobe Director and a former Chief Scientist at Macromedia. He is a former professor in the Interactive Telecommunications Program (ITP) at the New York University Tisch School of the Arts and instructor at Drexel University. He is committed to teaching and motivating successive scions of tech developers. He is a graduate of MIT and the Art Student League of New York.

He spent part of his childhood in Jamaica. His parents, in search of a better life for their children moved from the United Kingdom to New York. In 2012 he returned to his homeland Jamaica, to implement the Digital Jam 2.0 project. This included directing a course of mobile apps development workshops. According to him the vision for the project was to "export an innovative software development strategy to enable Jamaican youth to prosper in the global internet knowledge economy." He was honored for his innovations and commitment to coaching with the Silver Musgrave Medal for Science in 2012 by the Institute of Jamaica (IOJ).

== Publications ==
- Thompson, John (1996). Macromedia Director Lingo workshop for Windows (2nd ed.). Hayden Books. ISBN 1-56830-269-X. LCCN 96075194. OCLC 35395724.
- Thompson, John (1996). Macromedia Director Lingo workshop for Macintosh (2nd ed.). Hayden Books. ISBN 1-56830-287-8. LCCN 96077061. OCLC 35289235.
