= Spaceship Warlock =

1991 adventure video game

- Developers: Mike Saenz; Joe Sparks
- Publishers: Reactor, Inc.
- Engine: MacroMind Director
- Platforms: Macintosh, Windows
- Release: 1991 (Mac); 1994 (Windows)
- Genre: Adventure game
- Mode: Single-player

Spaceship Warlock is an adventure game created by Mike Saenz and Joe Sparks. The game was released in 1991 for the Macintosh and in 1994 for Windows.

The game was a first person adventure set in a sci-fi future. The player explores and interacts the game universe by clicking. Limited manipulation of objects is needed and there are several optional locations and things the player can explore or discover besides following the linear narrative. Dialogues involve typing a topic to a character such as "whiskey", "Terra" or "pirates". Some arcade sequences enrich the gameplay.

Spaceship Warlock was one of the earliest and best-known multimedia CD-ROM games to combine all original animation, story, music, and game play. The game menu refers to itself as a movie. Graphically ahead of its time and acquired a cult following. Spaceship Warlock is widely considered a pioneering work, and it received many awards and honors, including the "Best CD ROM Game of the Year" award from Macworld magazine.

Some of the game's outer space scenes are reminiscent of the art of Chesley Bonestell.

== Plot ==
The game is set after the end of the "Terran Empire". Terra has lost a millennial war against the Kroll, who then used a planetary technology to move Terra out of its orbit and move the planet to an unknown location deep in Kroll space. Humans now have no homeworld and some have ended up as space pirates.

The game features an unnamed protagonist starting in a dark alley in Stambul city. No details are given about the player character other that he is a "Terrie" (human). At first, the player can explore some streets of Stambul City but there not much to do as the player character has no money. However, after incapacitating an alien mugger, he is awarded several thousand credits by the police force, with which he can buy a ticket out of Stambul.

The player can afford a ticket to the luxurious cruise spaceship Belshazzar. As the player interacts with "Captain Starbird" and his daughter "Stella" the ship is attacked by the "Spaceship Warlock". The pirates led by Captain Hammer, an eyepatch-wearing space pirate and revolutionary leader board the ship and apprehend the passengers. In the brig, Hammer invites the player to his crew.

The player then goes on to battle and ultimately overthrow the evil Kroll empire and restore freedom to the galaxy.

== Lawsuit ==
The game's creators were involved in a legal dispute over the copyright:

Two leading multimedia developers, Michael Saenz and Joe Sparks, have been in court since the fall of 1993 in a dispute about the ownership of the copyright in their successful game, Spaceship Warlock. The dispute focuses on whether Joe was an employee or independent contractor of Reactor, Inc. (Mike Saenz's company) when they developed the game. If Joe is right in claiming that he was an independent contractor, he is co-owner of the copyright and has a right to half of the profits from the game. These profits could be worth hundreds of thousands of dollars.

== Reception ==
Spaceship Warlock was a commercial success on the Mac. Inside Mac Games reported in April 1993 that Warlock had sold over 20,000 copies and was the best-selling CD-ROM title for Macintosh.

Macworld inducted Spaceship Warlock into its 1991 Game Hall of Fame in the Best CD ROM Game category. Macworld said that Saenz and Sparks had created "a dazzling multimedia science-fiction novel that tips its hat to pulp classics while showing us the way to the future" and praised the game as "the best expression of cyberpunk available in any medium".

Computer Gaming World in 1992 reported that the game's "interactive movie experience is close enough that we hear credible reports of Macintosh users buying CD-ROM players just to be able to run Warlock". The magazine praised the game's graphics and sound, stating that "there is a good reason why [it] is among the top-selling CD-ROM titles of any genre". While noting the long load times and "spongy, wobbly" combat interface, it wrote that "the richly rendered scenes, objects and character that one searches, opens, pilots, converses with or fights against ... can convey the sensation of another reality". In 1993 the magazine called it "still one of the best" Macintosh CD-ROM products.
