= Soda Drinker Pro =

2016 video game

- Developer: Snowrunner Games
- Publisher: Snowrunner Games
- Writer: Will Brierly
- Engine: Unity
- Platforms: Windows; Xbox One; Android; Nintendo Entertainment System
- Release: WW: April 14, 2016
- Genres: Simulation video game Platformer
- Mode: Single-player

Soda Drinker Pro is a 2016 video game that simulates the act of drinking soda. The game was written by Will Brierly, and developed and published by American indie studio Snowrunner Games. It was released on April 14, 2016 to Steam and Xbox One.

== Gameplay ==
The player uses the WASD controls to walk around the soda drinking simulation. The mouse is used to look around the simulation. The left mouse button places the soda onto the player's mouth, while the right mouse button sips the soda. The soda has to be at the player's mouth for the soda to be sipped. There is a soda meter in the upper left hand corner of the game that measures the amount of soda left in the player's cup. Once the player has successfully completed drinking the soda they can then move to the next simulation. Throughout the environments, there are "Bonus Sodas" which can be collected.

=== Vivian Clark ===
Soda Drinker Pro contains a secret game titled Vivian Clark that can be accessed during gameplay by entering the house in the second level, the park. In the game's original version, it could be accessed by standing next to a particular rock for over thirty seconds.

Vivian Clark is made up of a series of linked mini-games, in which the goal is to beat the highest number of them possible consecutively without failing.

== Development ==
The first version of Soda Drinker Pro was developed over the course of one day in 2008. After its initial release of five levels, it continued in development until its release on Xbox One and Steam in 2016.

== Release ==
Soda Drinker Pro was posted to Steam Greenlight in March 2013. On January 29, 2015 the game was greenlit by the Steam Community. The game was released on April 14, 2016 to Windows through Steam and Xbox One. An Android version was also previously available on the Google Play Store, but it has since been removed.

In 2023, the game was released on the NES via Limited Run Games.

== Reception ==
Soda Drinker Pro holds a score of 30/100 on Metacritic based on nine critics, indicating "generally unfavorable reviews". Patrick Hancock of Destructoid wrote "The game looks and sounds like absolute garbage in every way possible. There are no redeeming qualities about Soda Drinker Pro."

The secret subgame, Vivian Clark, has been compared to the WarioWare series, LSD: Dream Emulator, and other abstract games.
