= Rhythm 'N' Face =

2000 video game

- Developer: OutSide Directors Company
- Publisher: Asmik Ace Entertainment
- Director: Osamu Sato
- Producers: Osamu Sato; Mikio Ono
- Programmers: Yoshinori Maeda; Tetsuya Yamamoto
- Artists: Osamu Sato; Noboru Iizuka; Shintaro Minami
- Composer: Osamu Sato
- Platform: PlayStation
- Release: JP: March 9, 2000
- Genre: Rhythm
- Mode: Single-player

Rhythm 'N' Face is a 2000 rhythm game developed by OutSide Directors Company and published by Asmik Ace Entertainment for the PlayStation. The final game project by Japanese artist Osamu Sato, it combines rhythm elements and art creation, with its gameplay revolving around accurately recreating drawings of faces while keeping to the rhythm of the music. It features twelve main stages that play out on a 15x15 grid, each featuring music in differing genres that are combined with Sato's style of house music.

Rhythm 'N' Face was exclusively released in Japan and fell into obscurity until English Let's Plays of Sato's 1998 game LSD: Dream Emulator gained him a cult following. Retrospective reviews of Rhythm 'N' Face are largely mixed, often praising its visuals and music while criticizing its difficulty. ●▲■, (Note: Pronounced as "Circle Triangle Square". Also known as マルサンカクシカク (Hepburn: Maru Sankaku Shikaku, lit. "Circle Triangle Square").) an iPhone app released in 2010 by OutSide Directors Company, revisited the drawing style seen in the game.

== Gameplay ==
The goal of Rhythm 'N' Face is to accurately recreate the face shown at the start of each level. The faces are made out of circles, squares, and triangles in reference to the PlayStation controller, and laid out on a 15x15 grid. On each side of the screen are anthropomorphic characters that dance to the game's instructions for placing each part of the face, which the player needs to replicate while maintaining the given rhythm. The player controls a cursor that can change between each shape, as well as enlarge or shrink the current shape when needed. If they continuously mimic the game's inputs while keeping the rhythm, the player will earn a combo. The combo is lost if an input is missed, and the player is forced to repeat the process for that part of the face. A live will be lost if the player misses without a currently active combo, and losing three lives ends the game. At the end of each stage, scores out of 50 are given for the player's rhythm and "style", the latter referring to drawing the face. The rhythm score can be increased by making extra moves not done in the instructions, while the style score can only go above 30 by improvising the face while keeping it consistent.

Rhythm 'N' Face features twelve main stages, each backed by a song composed by Japanese artist Osamu Sato in a different music genre, such as pop, funk, jazz, reggae, polka, flamenco, bossa nova, or "ethno" music. These songs frequently feature melodic references to classical and folk music and are produced in Sato's style of house music, though the bonus stages are an exception for their use of electro-acoustic and avant-garde compositions. The background music is dynamic, and making combos will introduce extra elements to give it a "fuller" sound. Certain passages cannot be heard unless the player achieves a determined amount of combos.

== Release and reception ==
Rhythm 'N' Face was released in Japan on March 9, 2000, through Asmik Ace Entertainment. It followed the release of Tokyo Planet Planetokio (1999) and was the final video game released by Sato. Like most of his games, it remained relatively obscure before Let's Plays of LSD: Dream Emulator in 2009 gained Sato and his work a cult following in the West. ●▲■, one of two iPhone apps released by OutSide Directors Company company in April 2010, was noted for having a similar premise and aesthetic to Rhythm 'N' Face, being a drawing app using geometric shapes.

Subsequent reviews of Rhythm 'N' Face have been mixed. Hardcore Gaming 101's Iwant complimented the "fresh" visuals and "distinctive style" of the music, but found it to not have friendly enough game design "to be a truly enjoyable experience." Neko Polpo of Pixel Flood noted the game's difficulty, even on lower levels, but concluded it was "simply incredible" and praised the precise nature of how its music and visuals combine. Polpo emphasized their love of the music, owing it to Sato's musical style, and selected the tracks "Swan Song 2000" and "Dr. Bochang Lee" as "fantastic" examples.
