= Quark Publishing Platform NextGen =

- Developer: Quark, Inc.
- Release: 2012

Quark Publishing Platform NextGen (QPP) is an enterprise level, SaaS-based content lifecycle management software solution for modular, metadata-driven, and compliance-controlled omnichannel publishing. Quark Publishing Platform was developed by Quark Software, Inc. in 2012, replacing its previous iteration Quark Publishing System.

== System overview ==
Quark Publishing Platform NextGen provides an integrated, single vendor solution for managing the entire content lifecycle, from content strategy and creation, through collaboration and publishing, to consumption and analysis. It offers low-code / no-code XML structured authoring in Microsoft Word or a web browser, component content storage and assembly via CCMS (Component Content Management System), and content intelligence based on AI and production, consumption and workflow analytics. It enables easy content reuse and is ideal for content automation in translation and localization workflows with its flexible content models and design templates.

Quark Publishing Platform NextGen was developed by Quark Software, Inc. in 2012, replacing its previous iteration Quark Publishing System.

== Features and use cases ==
Quark Publishing Platform NextGen is widely used by large global enterprises in industries where regulation and compliance is critically important, for both content operations and content publishing. This includes financial services, government & public sector, aerospace & defense, discrete manufacturing, and in life sciences such as the pharmaceutical and medtech sectors.

It has integration with Microsoft Office 365 and has a specific plugin for Microsoft Word called Quark XML Author which enables technical writers and subject-matter experts to write content components without having to learn XML, DITA or any other schema architecture.

In addition to supporting DITA, DocBook, S1000D and others, Quark has its own open XML schema called Quark Smart Content which allows for content automation and content reuse in wider use cases across the organization outside of traditional technical writing, where more visual content can be utilized. So it can be effective for content types such as research reports, data sheets and fund marketing documents, as well as standard operating procedures (SOPs) and product labels.

In April 2022, Quark Publishing Platform (QPP) NextGen v2.0 was released. Features include:

- Self-serviceability on enterprise content processes
- Structured authoring
- Component content management
- Omnichannel publishing
- Content intelligence
- Flexible cloud deployment options

On February 28, 2023, QPP NextGen v3.0 was released with simplified role-based dashboards and advanced analytics capabilities. In 2023, Quark Publishing Platform NextGen won the People's Choice Stevie Award for Favorite New Products — Content Management Solution.

== Release history ==
QPS Release 9.x	Dates
9	25-03-2011
9.1	27-08-2011
9.2	23-12-2011
9.5	12-11-2012

QPP Release 12.x/11.x/10.x	Dates
10.1	18-03-2014
10.2	02-09-2014
10.5	26-12-2014
11	23-07-2015
11.1	16-10-2015
11.2	02-02-2016
12	30-09-2016

QPP Release 13.x	Dates
13	09-06-2017
13.1	10-10-2017
13.2	03-04-2018
14	07-09-2018
14.2	22-02-2019
14.3	22-07-2019
14.3.1.3	16-03-2020
14.3.1.4	13-05-2020
14.3.1.6	15-07-2020
14.3.1.12	01-12-2021
14.3.1.13	25-03-2022
15	24-12-2019
15.0.1	16-03-2020
15.0.4	21-08-2021
15.0.18	31-08-2021
15.0.17	28-10-2021
15.0.20	30-11-2021
15.0.22	17-06-2022
15.1.1	17-08-2022

QPP Release 16.x	Dates
16	18-02-2022
16.1	02-06-2022
16.2	05-08-2022
16.2.0.1	24-08-2022
16.3	18-01-2023
16.4	28-04-2023
16.4.1	26-05-2023

QPP NextGen	Dates
2.0	12-05-22
3.0	28-02-23
