= Mia's Reading Adventure: The Search for Grandma's Remedy =

1998 video game

- Developer: Kutoka Interactive
- Publisher: Kutoka Interactive
- Platforms: Macintosh, Windows
- Release: November 1998

Mia's Reading Adventure: The Search for Grandma's Remedy is a 1998 video game developed and published by Montreal-based studio Kutoka Interactive. The game is aimed at children age 5.

== Gameplay ==
In Mia: The Search for Grandma's Remedy, players accompany a young mouse on a quest to find a cure for her sick grandmother. Acting as Mia's guide, children ages five to nine navigate through a series of nine language-based puzzles, each unlocking vital clues that propel the journey forward.

== Reception ==
Reception

Review scores
Publication	Score
FamilyPC	84%
Game Vortex	9/10
Macworld	4/5
PC Magazine	3/5

PC Magazine rated the game a 3 of 5 saying "Mia, though very well done will not do this for younger kids. For the older set, however - and especially for the girls - Mia should be a lot of fun."

Macworld rated the game a 4 of 5 saying "The dazzling artwork and sound complement the learning tools as children ages five to nine try to decipher where Mia should go next"

Game Vortex rated the game a 9 of 10 saying "If the engine were a bit smoother -- jumpiness on a 450 MHz machine is just frightening, considering the minimum system is a P100 -- this game would be practically perfect in both presentation and usefulness. As it is, Mia: The Search for Grandma’s Remedy is still a great game, marred by a few speed problems that detract only slightly from the enjoyment of a well-put-together edutainment title"

PC Alamode Magazine said "All in all, not a bad program for the kids and you may be quite pleased with it"

The Canadian Toy Testing Council gave Mia's Reading Adventure: The Search for Grandma's Remedy three stars on a scale of three stars, two stars, one star, novelty, not recommended.

Mia's Reading Adventure: The Search for Grandma's Remedy sold 40,000 copies by April 1999.

== See also ==
- Mia's Big Adventure Collection
