= The Cassandra Galleries =

1997 video game

- Developer: Kutoka Interactive
- Publisher: Corel
- Designer: Richard Vincent
- Platforms: Microsoft Windows; Mac OS
- Release: March 1997
- Genre: Puzzle adventure
- Mode: Single-player

The Cassandra Galleries is a 1997 puzzle adventure video game developed by Kutoka Interactive and published by Corel. Taking place in a first-person 3D environment, the player assumes the role of a appraiser tasked with assessing the mansion belonging to a wealthy media mogul who disappeared along with his daughter under mysterious circumstances. As the game progresses, the player solves environmental puzzles that help solve the reason behind their disappearance. The game features full-motion video sequences and was developed for both Mac OS and Microsoft Windows. It was the first video game developed by Kutoka Interactive, an educational software and video game developer based in Montreal, Quebec. It received mixed reviews.

== Gameplay and plot ==
The game takes place in a surreal, first-person 3D environment and features full-motion video; reviewers have compared it to Myst and The 7th Guest.

In The Cassandra Galleries, the player character assumes the role of an appraiser, tasked with assessing the estate of the Cassandra family following the unexplained disappearance of the last two living family members, the wealthy media tycoon William Cassandra and his daughter Maya. Following their disappearance, the Cassandra mansion is slated to be repurposed as an art gallery. The player explores the mansion's various rooms and galleries to uncover the circumstances surrounding the family's absence. Throughout the investigation, the player interacts with various members of the family's former entourage, who provide essential clues and context.

Interaction within the game is driven by a point-and-click interface that allows for the discovery of hidden objects and environmental hints necessary for progression. The game's primary objective requires the player navigate the mansion to collect sculptures from the mansion's studio and return them to their appropriate locations across seven galleries, each themed after a specific historical art movement, such as Romanticism, Art Deco, and Modernism. The mansion itself is presented as a surreal 3D environment, seen from the player's own perspective. Players must additionally player solve environmental puzzles located throughout the mansion. Upon the successful placement of an artifact, the player is teleported to a stylized universe corresponding to the specific art movement, where further puzzles must be completed to unlock additional clues. There are 49 such environmental puzzles to solve in total. Some of the puzzles' mechanics include word games, sound-guessing games, and matching games, among others.

== Development ==
The Cassandra Galleries was the first video game developed by Kutoka Interactive, an educational software and video game developer based in Montreal, Quebec. It was the brainchild of Richard Vincent, the founder of Kutoka, who began developing the game sometime in 1994. Full production of the game commenced in 1996. Its production schedule was reduced to six months, down from ten months, in order for the game to meet its December 1996 release deadline, in time for Christmas. Principal photography of the full-motion video clips used in the game was still underway by September 1996.

Vincent described the development of The Cassandra Galleries as both a shoestring-budget affair and a significant challenge. He lamented in 1996: "It would be incredibly convenient to have other people out there who are experimenting with the exact same things we are. Everything we set out to do presents a constant challenge: figuring out how to do it, figuring out how to do it affordably, and finding talent—people who already have experience in this field... It's impossible". According to Vincent, many of the game's crew members were hired from outside industries.

An unfinished version of The Cassandra Galleries was first unveiled at the 1996 E3 in Los Angeles, California in May. Following their exhibition of the game, Kutoka secured the funding to finish the game from Corel, an Ontario-based software company headquartered in Ottawa. Corel also agreed to publish and distribute the game. The breadth of the game's content required distribution on two CD-ROMs, making for a substantial install size for a game of its genre at the time. Corel advertised over 40 hours worth of gameplay within The Cassandra Galleries. The game was developed for both Mac OS and Microsoft Windows, with the CD-ROMs usable on both platforms.

== Release and reception ==
Reception

Review scores
Publication	Score
Adventure Gamers	3/5
Quandary Computer Game Reviews	2.5/5

Kutoka missed its Christmas 1996 deadline for The Cassandra Galleries; it was instead released in March 1997. It sold in low quantity and is now rare on the secondhand market, according to Adventure Classic Gaming. The game received middling reviews in the press, with the game's visual style and puzzle mechanics eliciting comparisons to Myst, The 7th Guest, and The 11th Hour.

For Quandary Computer Game Reviews, Rosemary Young wrote that the game's plot was far less central to the game than its puzzles, with the story "only imping[ing] occasionally when you are rewarded with shortish video clips after completing sections of the game". Of the puzzles, Young called them "both a great strength and a weakness ... The way in which the game is constructed, inviting you to seek out answers, works particularly well ... but as you can generally just try again if you get an answer wrong, it doesn't take long to succeed by a simple process of elimination. Being so forgiving negates some of the fun of having to carry out your own search-and-rescue effort to complete these challenges".

Bernadette Houghton of the Australian PC Update called the puzzles "quite challenging" and "sure to appeal to puzzle-aholics". Houghton panned the mouse-driven method of navigating through the mansion, calling it "awkward", albeit "you soon get used to it". She praised the graphics and music and felt that game brimmed with atmosphere. Young was more reserved with her praise of the graphics, writing that they "aren't, of course, gee-whiz 3D with 360-degree panning, quite the opposite. But [the galleries] are a pleasant place to be, and they change in appearance and atmosphere as you move through different time periods and different architectural styles during the course of the game".

The game's abrupt ending received criticism, with Ray Ivey of Adventure Gamers calling it "the worst, lamest ending I've ever seen in a game ... Luckily, I had been adequately warned ... But if [I] were to innocently play this game and expect some terrific payoff regarding the Amazing Disappearing Cassandras, you'd be extremely disappointed—angry, even. This is yet another game that feels like it lost its budget toward the end". Adventure Classic Gaming concurred, with Peter Rootham-Smith calling it "the worst ending of any game I have ever played". Young, while more mild in her scorn, deemed that "the eventual resolution isn't very satisfying".
