= Kutoka Interactive =

Educational software company

- Type: Private-owed company
- Industry: CD-ROMs, DVD-ROMs
- Defunct: September 2017
- Headquarters: Montreal, Quebec, Canada
- Website: www.kutoka.com

Kutoka Interactive was an educational software company founded in Montreal, Quebec, in 1995. The company produced, developed, and distributed both subject-based and grade-based video games for Windows and Macintosh from 1996 to 2017. They were most famous for their Mia games.

== Background ==
Founded in Montreal in 1995, Kutoka started developing multimedia CD-ROM titles for third-party publishers. Some of the company's biggest clients included Fisher-Price, Corel, and Compaq.

In 1998, Kutoka launched its first self-published title Mia's Reading Adventure: The Search for Grandma's Remedy, assuming complete responsibility for product development, publishing, and distribution.

In March 2009, Kutoka's products were sold through licensees in 42 countries, in 14 languages.

In 2017, Kutoka decided to shut down their operations after 22 years of service. There was no bankruptcy. The company transferred its assets and IP to Zoki S.E.N.C. An open letter from the company's remaining employees was posted to Kutoka's website, which gave thanks to their supporters and shareholders. The website's former page web has been archived by the Wayback Machine at the request of Kutoka. and is also available via a link in the message on the home page.

== Products ==
=== Mia ===
- In Mia's Big Adventure Collection:
  - Mia's Reading Adventure: The Bugaboo Bugs (2007)
  - Mia's Language Adventure: The Kidnap Caper (2003)
  - Mia's Math Adventure: Just in Time! (2001)
  - Mia's Science Adventure: Romaine's New Hat (2000)
  - Mia's Reading Adventure: The Search for Grandma's Remedy (1998)
- Click & Create with Mia: A Complete Creativity Studio (2002)

==== Cartoon series ====
In 2010 Radio Canada and Sardine Productions began developing a 26-episode cartoon series based on the games. The series was broadcasting on the Toonavision channel as of December 2019.

=== Didi & Ditto ===
- In the Didi & Ditto collection:
  - Didi & Ditto Preschool: Mother Nature's Visit
  - Didi & Ditto First Grade: The Wolf King
  - Didi & Ditto Kindergarten: A Feast for Zolt

=== Others ===
- The Cassandra Galleries
- Cyber Grannies
- Tracker Finds A New Home
- In the EazySpeak collection:
  - EazySpeak French
  - EazySpeak Spanish
- In Gameware Development's Creatures collection:
  - Creatures Village
  - Creatures Exodus
- For Game Factory
  - Miss Spider: Scavenger Hunt

== Awards ==
- 2003 United Nations World Summit Award for the Mia series (Geneva)
- 2003 Dr. Toy's Outstanding Toy Manufacturer Recognition of Excellence Award (San Francisco)
- 2002 SODEC Award of Excellence in exports (Montreal)
- 1999 Octas Award of Excellence (Montreal)
