= Burning Image =

American deathrock band

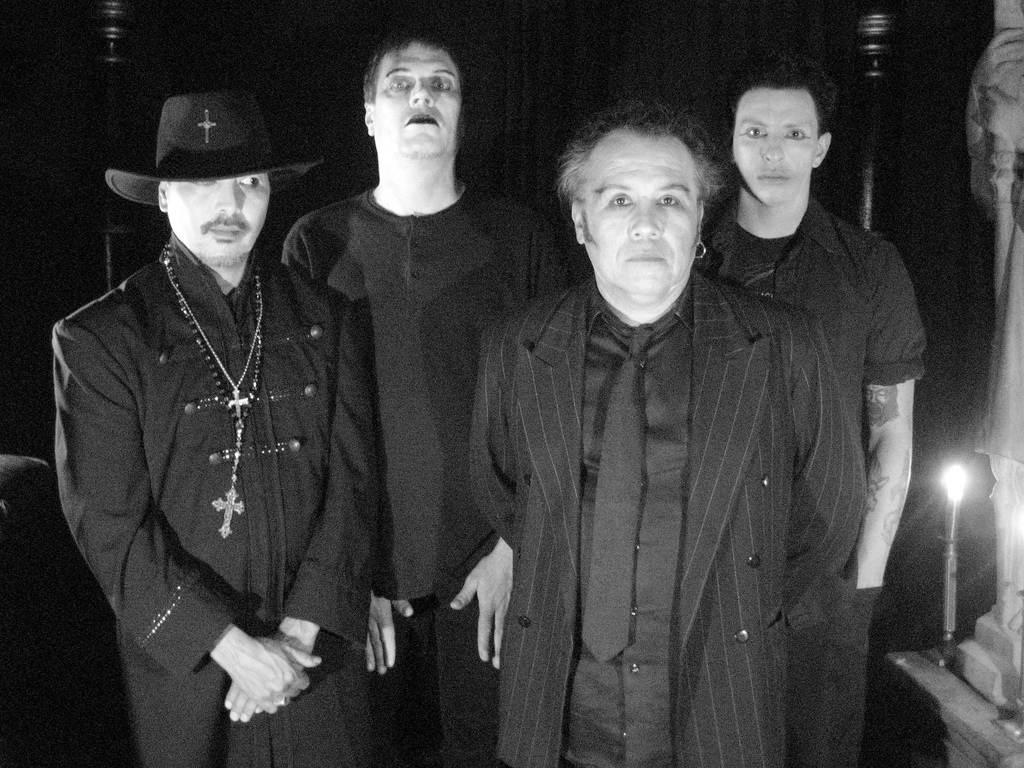

Background information
- Origin: Bakersfield, California, U.S.
- Genres: Deathrock
- Years active: 1982–1987, 2004–present
- Labels: Alternative Tentacles, Strobelight, Mystic, Going Underground
- Members: Moe Adame; Tony Bonanno; Anthony Leyva; Michael Bonanno
- Past members: Joe Sparks; Paul Burch
- Website: mokat666.wixsite.com/burningimage

Burning Image are an American deathrock band formed in Bakersfield, California in 1982. Burning Image first released a 7" single with the songs "The Final Conflict" and "Burning Image, Burning" in the summer of 1984. The compilation 1983–1987 in 2004 and album Fantasma (2009) were both released on Alternative Tentacles, record label owned by former Dead Kennedys singer, Jello Biafra, with album Oleander (2011) being self-published. Burning Image celebrates 39 years as a band, in 2021, with a new album.

Burning Image is one of the original bands of the early 1980s California Deathrock scene, along with 45 Grave and Christian Death, playing shows with bands including Specimen, Dead Kennedys, Butthole Surfers, and Timothy Leary.

== History ==
=== 1980s ===
The first incarnation of what became Burning Image was The Pictures, which played their first shows in Bakersfield in early 1982, and featured Moe Adame (guitar, vocals) Tony Bonanno (guitar, vocals) Brad Higgins (bass) and a host of drummers. After the departure of Higgins, Adame and Bonanno decided to look for a bassist and a drummer. Joe Sparks and Paul Burch were playing in the band Public Art at a backyard party, when Adame and Bonanno, who were at the party, decided that night that both Burch and Sparks needed to be in The Pictures. Burch and Sparks joined shortly thereafter with Bonanno switching to bass. The band immediately started writing songs and playing shows, with "Time Is Running Out", "The Lower Walks" and "You've Changed" being the first batch of songs written as a new band. After playing a few shows, the band decided that The Pictures was no longer fitting as a band name, as the direction of the band began to be more inspired by darker themes in the music of Bauhaus, The Cure, Christian Death and the California hardcore punk scene.

In 1983, Burning Image recorded a 7" single with the songs "The Final Conflict" and "Burning Image, Burning" which was recorded at Casbah Recording Studio in Fullerton, California, by Chaz Ramirez, producer and engineer of Mommy's Little Monster by Social Distortion. The artwork for the 7" single was done by Art Morales, creator of the artwork for Mommy's Little Monster. After the release of the single, Burch and Sparks went to Berkeley, California to promote the record on the local college radio station. Jello Biafra of the Dead Kennedys was in the radio station doing his own show when he heard the song "The Final Conflict" and asked who the band was playing the song and liked the song so much that he invited Burning Image to open a show for them in San Francisco.

Burning Image returned to the studio to record the songs "Love Mask" and "Hives". After one more recording session which produced the songs "Prey", "Shadows", and "The Image", the band ceased to exist in the summer of 1987. Both Burch and Sparks moved to San Francisco and Bonanno left the music scene.

=== 1990s–2010s ===
Adame continued to play in Bakersfield with several bands while starting up a new band called I Viscera in 1996, with Burch back on drums and newest member Anthony Leyva on bass. I Viscera played a show in Los Angeles with Penis Flytrap in the summer of 2000, as well as some Bakersfield shows. I Viscera disbanded in 2002.

=== Return ===
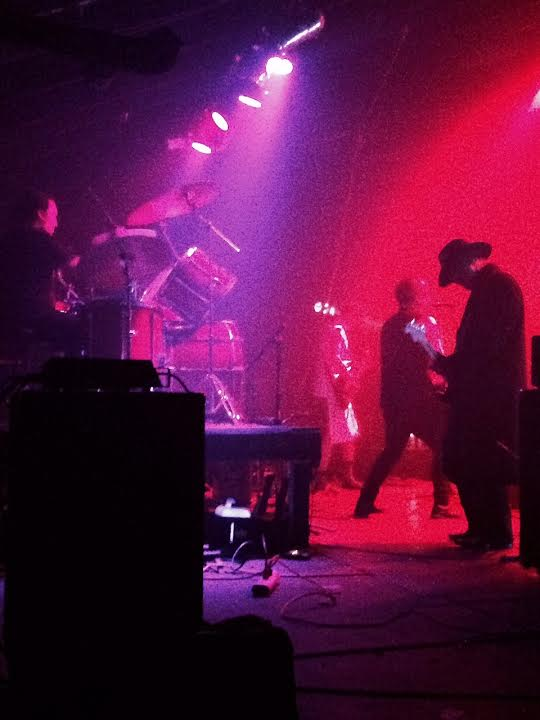
Burning Image at The Black Castle, Los Angeles, 2015

Adame went to Los Angeles to see Jello Biafra perform a spoken word show at the Echo Lounge. After the show, Biafra invited Adame and his wife backstage to talk and to get reacquainted. Biafra asked Adame if he had any more Burning Image music and Adame told him that he had masters for every recording they had done. Biafra asked Adame if he would allow him to release a collection of Burning Image music on Alternative Tentacles . The collection, titled 1983–1987, was released in 2004. Burning Image played a reunion show in Bakersfield at the Maestri Gallery on June 19, 2004.

After the show, the band once again went their separate ways. Strobelight Records contacted Adame about including a Burning Image song on a compilation that they were releasing in 2006 titled Kaliffornian Deathrock. A new song, "Haunted" was submitted for the compilation. Burning Image featuring original members Adame, Bonanno and Burch with returning bass player Leyva, played the Wake the Dead festival in spring 2007, along with Ausgang, Cinema Strange, Tragic Black, Scarlet's Remains and Pins and Needles. On November 12, 2007, Burning Image opened a show for Christian Death 1334 featuring original members James McGearty and Rikk Agnew as well as former Shadow Project founder, Eva O.

After those shows, Burning Image began writing material for their next album Fantasma, released on Alternative Tentacles in 2009. Fantasma was later described by Allmusic reviewer Tim DiGravina as "must-listen material for fans of death or goth rock" and nominated for Album of the Year 2009 on Deathrock.com. Burning Image played shows in California soon after, culminating with the Alternative Tentacles 30th anniversary show at the Great American Music Hall in San Francisco, in which they opened for Jello Biafra and the Guantanamo School of Medicine, Alice Donut and Victims Family.

2011 release Oleander's source of inspiration was the Lords of Bakersfield cases, Adame stated in an interview: "It's like a local thing I've known about since I was a teenager. What it is apparently, allegedly, higher-ups in Bakersfield, we're talking like, judges and cops and business owners, apparently they used to, allegedly, have this secret society, called the Lords of Bakersfield, and before that it was called the White Orchid Society. Basically what they would do is have parties and have young guys come to the parties and have them "service" these higher-ups, you know what I mean? To me it was always this local folklore kind of deal, so what happened was that Sean Penn had narrated a documentary called Witch Hunt based on the early '80s molestation charges upon dozens of people in town and that was led by the local prosecutor of the time. Sean Penn apparently asked Jello if he knew about what was happening in Bakersfield, so that's why Jello asked my wife, "Hey, do you know anything about the Lords of Bakersfield?"... So after we told Jello, his jaw dropped to the floor... he asked me again, "Moe, so are you guys going to write a new album?"... He says, "That sounds like some intense subject matter, maybe you should write about that." I really didn't give it a second thought that night, but the more I thought about it, I thought wow... the possibilities."

The latest album, Follow the Fallout, was released in July of 2024.

A new single “Fearmonger” was released in August 2024

== Discography ==
=== Albums ===
- Fantasma (Alternative Tentacles 2009)
- Oleander (2011)
- The Grand Guignol (2014)
- Oleander Revisited (2017)
- Songs of Reproach and Redemption (2018)
- Burning Image (2018)
- The King Is Dead (2019)
- Arrival (2021)
- Follow the Fallout (2024)

=== Singles ===
- The Final Conflict (1984)
- The Final Conflict / Reissue (Going Underground Records 2021)
- Fearmonger (2024)

=== Retrospectives ===
- 1983–1987 (Alternative Tentacles 2004)

=== Compilation appearances ===
- Let's Die (Mystic Records 1985)
- Cultivation 91 (Independent 1991)
- Kaliffornian Deathrock (Strobelight Records 2006)
