= Marc Canter =

American internet entrepreneur

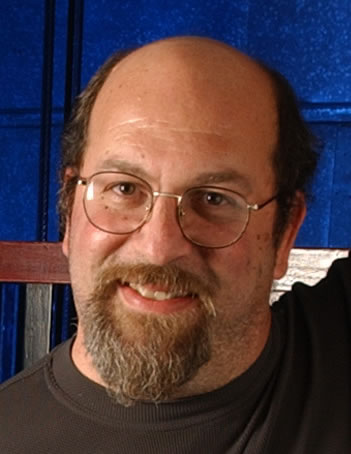
- Occupation: Entrepreneur
- Years active: 1982–present
- Known for: Co-founder of Macromind, predecessor to Macromedia

Marc Canter is an American internet entrepreneur, speaker, technology evangelist and early pioneer of online software, and is often called the "godfather of multimedia". Canter is a CEO of Instigate, Inc. Canter is best known for being the co-founder and CEO of MacroMind, the company that became Macromedia.

== Early life ==
Canter grew up in a political environment. His father was a Democratic politician and organizer of a meat packers union in Chicago, and a mentor to political consultant David Axelrod. His grandfather, Harry Canter, was leader of the Communist Party of Massachusetts, a translator for the Soviet Union, and later, a publisher of communism-related books as well as a leftist weekly, the Chicago Star, that he bought from Frank Marshall Davis. Canter recalls marching with Martin Luther King Jr. and being heavily involved in Chicago political campaigns as a child.

A singer in childhood, Canter attended Kenwood Academy on Chicago's South Side prior to enrolling in Oberlin College intending to become an opera singer, and was exposed there to synthesizers, computer music, and building and coding computers.

== Career ==
After college, Canter travelled to New York City to help his friends build a music studio called "Noise New York." During this time Canter learned about laserdiscs, laser light shows, NAPLPS, pro audio and video equipment, and a then-new technology called videodiscs. Canter has also worked as a taxi driver.

Canter dropped out of graduate school to work for Bally-Midway, programming music and graphics for video games. He coded one of the earliest pieces of licensed music content ("Peter Gunn" for Spyhunter).

Canter co-founded MacroMind in 1984, the company that later became Macromedia, and began developing for the newly launched Apple Macintosh. Canter launched MacroMind with the idea of it being a "software rock and roll band", and the company created the first multimedia player, the first cross-platform authoring system and the world's leading multimedia platform. Partly due to his work with the company, Canter is considered one of the founders of multimedia. In the 1990s, he was the chairman of virtual technology company Canter Technology.

At MacroMind, Canter was involved in one of the first known cases of a virus being distributed via commercial software. According to the March 16, 1988 edition of the Toronto Star, several MacroMind products shipped with virus infected media. Analysis later revealed that Canter's computer was infected with the virus while he was working on training material for the software products. MacroMind and Canter moved to San Francisco, California, where the company received venture capital funding and was the third software-related investment of the firm Kleiner Perkins Caufield & Byers. To speed growth, Macromind engaged in a series of mergers and acquisitions in the late 1980s and early 1990s, renaming itself Macromedia in 1991.

After leaving in 1991, Canter embarked on a number of online projects, including an online interactive band (the Mediaband), an online video series (the Marc Canter Show), and an online restaurant operating system, Mediabar. It was designed to be a waterhole for shared music experiences. Through the 1990s, Canter was a "fixture of the local tech scene", described as a technology provocateur and advocate, part of a social and business technology community that included Robert Scoble, Ron Conway, Dave Winer, Sean Parker, Mark Pincus, and Michael Arrington, among others. He was a major proponent of the CD-ROM being a vehicle for interactive video, serendipitously around the time the Windows 95 operating system was released.

In the 1990s and 2000s, Canter was involved in various startups in the formulative stages of product development and design. He was an early participant in Tribe.net and helped develop its "tribes" system, and early social network 'groups' technology. He consulted for Ruckus Network and Visual Media. Broadband Mechanics has also collaborated with Avid Technology.

Canter and J. D. Lasica founded a video sharing website, Ourmedia in March 2005. Canter was founder and CEO of Broadband Mechanics, a digital lifestyle aggregator (DLA) company. Broadband Mechanics built tools and environments, including "People Aggregator", to enable online communities.

Burnt out on venture-funded companies, and described as having burned all of his bridges in Silicon Valley, Canter and his family moved to Cleveland, Ohio in 2009. Intending to get out of the technology business. There, he became involved in economic development projects involving teaching multimedia coding skills to unemployed workers. Canter later returned to San Francisco.

In 2014, Canter launched Thingface, an authoring tool for developers to create Internet of things-related mobile applications. The company was later renamed Interface.

In 2015, Canter, along with four other executives, cofounded Cola, a company that launched a messaging application designed to serve as a platform for messaging-based mobile applications. Canter described the company as "Slack for the rest of us."

In 2017, Canter co-founded Instigate, an AI company that is a new way for Creators to tell stories with interactive features and real engagement. Instigate is available as a download. Canter is the CEO of Instigate based in Silicon Valley.

== Internet policy and culture ==
Canter is a contributor to many open standards efforts and advocates for end-user controlled digital identities and content - being a co-founder of the "Identity Gang", and a co-signer of the Social Web Users' Bill of Rights. He has consulted with global corporations including PCCW and Intel and has written on the multimedia industry, micro-content publishing and social networking.
