= Word Juggler =

- Original author: Tim Gill
- Developer: Quark, Inc.
- Operating system: Apple SOS, ProDOS
- Platform: Apple IIc, IIe, III
- Type: Word processor
- License: Proprietary

Word Juggler was a word processor application by Quark, Inc. for the Apple IIe, IIc, and III computers. Until the release of AppleWorks, Word Juggler was the leading word processor on the IIe and IIc, beating out Apple Writer. The software was copy protected with a hardware dongle.

It was one of the first software titles to use ProDOS.

The software was well received and was considered easy to learn and master.

The software also came with a dictionary/spell checker called Lexicheck which was also well received.

== Apple III version ==
The software was the first commercially available word processor for the Apple III and featured formatting commands such as margin settings, centering, justification, bold, underlined, subscript, superscripts, doublestrike, titles, footnotes, and page numbers. The program was also able to use the Apple III redefinable keyboard to provide single-stroke editor commands (such as find, delete character, delete line, and so forth).

The Apple III version made use of the full 80 column display, and could support 1210 lines with 128K memory, or 806 lines with 96k memory.

The Apple III version supported printing with Qume, Diablo, and Xerox printers.

For the Apple III version which came on a single diskette with a backup copy and instruction manual, the MSRP was US$295.
