= Total Distortion =

1995 video game

- Developer: Pop Rocket
- Publisher: Pop Rocket
- Engine: Macromedia Director
- Platforms: Windows, Macintosh
- Release: November 1995
- Genres: Point-and-click adventure, music

Total Distortion is a 1995 full motion video adventure game for Mac and Windows, developed by Pop Rocket.

== Gameplay ==
The gameplay has the player take the role of a music video producer in the Distortion Dimension, where they fight Guitar Warriors in guitar battles. At the start of the game, the player is able to choose their end goal, either to earn enough fame points, earn a certain amount of money, or both. To make money and fame points, the player has to make and sell music videos to television producers using a range of footage, more of which can be filmed whilst exploring the Distortion Dimension. The player must also manage their physical and mental energy with food and sleep. If the player runs out of either, they will eventually die.

The game is also known for its sense of humor, particularly its game over screen featuring the song You Are Dead, in which the vocalist continuously makes fun of the player for losing.

== Plot ==
Six years before the player's journey to the Distortion Dimension begins, an alien artifact is discovered, which world governments learn is a device that can teleport any object anywhere interdimensionally, which revolutionizes industries on Earth. The technology, however, is not perfect, with more power being required the bigger the object being transmitted is, and organic beings being forced into a coma for six weeks upon teleportation, leading to life support systems being invented to allow for safe interdimensional travel. A pattern begins to emerge exploring other dimensions: Different forms of Earth's pop culture inhabited every dimension, causing speculation that the dimensions were created from the collective dreaming minds of Earth's youth. Present day, the player is a music video producer who is entrusted with 3 million dollars in inheritance from a dead relative. The game starts with the player risking all this money to set out for the Distortion Dimension, named for its abundance of loud guitar noise, to search for new and exciting music video material which could result in even larger profits. However, the journey runs the risk of a financial net loss, being stranded in another dimension, or death.

== Development ==
The game was developed using Macromedia Director by Pop Rocket, a company founded in December 1991. Originally slated for Q4 1993, the game was delayed until November 1995. In North America the game was distributed by Electronic Arts. It was showcased at E3 1995.

The programming of this game was headed up mostly by Joe Sparks, creator of Radiskull and Devil Doll and Spaceship Warlock.

== Reception ==
Reception

Review score
Publication	Score
MacUser	3/5

It was critically acclaimed for being innovative and creative.

Games Domain said "TD is Pop Rocket's first release and let me be the first to say it (but I'm sure I won't be the last) it rocks!".

The game sold over 100,000 units.
