= Eastern Mind: The Lost Souls of Tong Nou =

1994 video game

- North American cover art
- Developer: OutSide Directors Company
- Publishers: JP: Sony Music Entertainment Japan; NA: Sony Imagesoft
- Director: Osamu Sato
- Producer: Osamu Sato
- Programmer: Amiko Takama
- Artist: Osamu Sato
- Writers: Osamu Sato; Hiroko Nishikawa
- Composer: Osamu Sato
- Engine: Macromedia Director
- Platforms: Classic Mac OS; Windows
- Release: Classic Mac OS: JP: May 21, 1994; NA: August 1995; Windows: NA: August 1995
- Genre: Point-and-click adventure
- Mode: Single-player

Eastern Mind: The Lost Souls of Tong Nou (Note: 東脳, Tonnō; lit. 'eastern mind') is a 1994 point-and-click adventure game by Japanese artist Osamu Sato. The plot follows a man named Rin whose soul is taken by the island of Tong-Nou. Rin travels to Tong-Nou to fulfill the lives of nine creatures and regain his soul. Whenever Rin dies, the player chooses what creature Rin will be reincarnated into.

Sato began development on Eastern Mind in 1993 with three collaborators. He incorporated several of his own spiritual beliefs, including reincarnation and animism, in the game's plot. It was published in Japan by Sony Music Entertainment Japan in 1994 for Classic Mac OS and in North America by Sony Imagesoft the following year for both Mac and Windows. Critics gave mixed reactions to the game, with some praising its surreal imagery, but many describing it as bizarre and disturbing. A sequel, Chu-Teng, (Note: 中天, Chūten; lit. 'mid-heaven') was released in 1995.

== Plot and gameplay ==
Gameplay screenshot of Eastern Mind. The player is looking at the Tree of Life (Mingke-shu) and the interface displays dialogue and items.

Eastern Mind is a point-and-click adventure game about a man named Rin who has lost his soul. A friend, Yashiro gives him an artificial soul that will last 49 days, with which he goes on a quest to the island of Tong Nou to recover his soul. The island takes the form of a human head and the player can enter its various orifices to access locations in the game. The player must die and be reincarnated as nine different creatures in order to complete nine unique missions. After dying, the outcome of Rin's transmigration is determined by the player's specific choice between three pairs of eyes, three noses, and three mouths. When every mission has been completed, the player is able to reach Central Mountain and recover Rin's soul.

== Development ==
In 1993, game director, producer, artist, composer, and co-writer Osamu Sato became Sony Music Japan's Digital Entertainment Program's Grand Prix winner. This, plus other awards on his résumé, allowed him to create Eastern Mind as a four-person team which included himself and his wife. This gave him the leverage he needed to get Sony to publish the game. Sato began development on Chu-Teng after the publication of Eastern Mind. The games were originally designed to be part of a trilogy, but this idea was abandoned during development. He would follow these projects with another game, LSD: Dream Emulator, in 1998.

Sato described Eastern Mind as an interactive CD-ROM experience rather than a video game, as he felt this classification would give him more legitimacy in the American market. Incorporating elements of his own Buddhist belief system, the game explores transmigration; dying is not seen as a typical game over state, ending the narrative. It is instead followed by the player revived as a different character, a process necessary to advance through the story. The game was created using Macromedia Director.

Sato felt it was important that he appear in his game; the green island of Tong Nou is an altered version of the head of the game's designer. At the time of development, Sato was a techno-house musician; he therefore used this genre for the game's soundtrack. There is no voice acting, and instead the words appear at the bottom of the screen as subtitles. The narrative was co-written by Hiroko Nishikawa, who worked as a screenwriter on many of Sato's works. Hardcore Gaming 101 surmised that Sato designed the sequel to be more traditional out of fear that the first game's weirdness may have scared people away, noting that in retrospect this became Eastern Mind's draw card. Five of the game's musical tracks would be featured on Sato's 1995 album Transmigration. Reworked versions of the game's themes would be released on another album of Sato's in 2017, All Things Must Be Equal.

== Release ==
Eastern Mind was first released in Japan by Sony Music Entertainment Japan in April 1994, and was later localized in English and released by Sony Imagesoft for Microsoft Windows as well as Mac OS in early August 1995. The game was also planned to be released for the PlayStation, but fell through. The game became extremely rare, and by 2002, the game would sell on eBay to collectors for a few hundred dollars. For many years, the game passed hands through anonymous torrent files. In 2008, a blogger discovered the game and started a YouTube channel to highlight it and to follow the rediscovery of its sequel Chu-Teng.

== Reception ==
Tap Repeatedly thought the game was the strangest they had ever played, and loved the game for it. Quandary felt the title's identity was torn between a game and an exploration of multimedia capabilities. PC Multimedia & Entertainment Magazine wrote that while the game is enjoyable to play, it may be asking too much of their readers to take a leap of faith and pay for the product. Vice described it as one of the most bizarre and terrifying games of all time, additionally deeming it "self-indulgent", "psychedelic", "disturbing", and "niche". The site also pointed out that the game is often ridiculed as an example of the strangeness of Japanese culture, rather than a testament to the blood, sweat, and tears Sato poured into his work. Complex listed the game in a list of The 10 Weirdest Japanese Video Games Ever Made, deeming it an obscure freak show. Wired praised the game as an overwhelmingly surreal Myst-like experience, complimenting Sato's simultaneously elaborate and childlike art design. Hardcore Gaming 101 noted the difficulty of the puzzles due to the game purposely being devoid of logic, and embraced this as a positive. Kill Screen felt that the title was not a game, and rather a window into the recesses of Sato's mind. Biglobe felt the characters were eerie and humorous, praising the sense of oriental animism that pervaded the experience. Publication Karapaia thought the game "tastes the strangeness that lurks in the depths of psychology". Rolling Stone suggested that the game instills an "initial tinge of disorientation [that] gives way to cultural vertigo" as the Western player realises that unlike usual games where they kill the enemy, the protagonist has to die in order to progress. Wall Street Journal deemed it "more of a journey than a story or moral tale".

Next Generation reviewed the Macintosh version of the game, rating it two stars out of five, and stated that "Eastern Mind gives the feel of a complex mythology based on the Buddhist ideal of continual reincarnation as progress toward redemption. Maybe players versed in ethnic studies can even use that knowledge to their advantage in the course of the game; but we have no idea."

=== Chu-Teng ===
A sequel, titled Chu-Teng (中天, lit. 'mid-heaven'), was released in Japan for Mac and Windows on October 21, 1995. Originally assumed lost due to its extreme rarity, the game's ISO image surfaced on the internet in 2014. Reviewing the game, Hardcore Gaming 101 felt that with the transmigration element dropped, it became more of an ordinary adventure game than its predecessor, which was a "letdown" due to stripping away what they believed made Eastern Mind "great".
