= Starbird =

Star Bird is the name of a toy made from 1978 to 1981.

Starbird is a surname. Notable people with the surname include:

- Alfred A. Starbird (1875–1956), US Army brigadier general
- Alfred D. Starbird (1912–1983), athlete and US Army lieutenant general
- George Starbird (1908–1994), American politician
- Hannah Judkins Starbird (1832–1922), American army nurse of the American Civil War
- Kate Starbird (born 1975), American basketball player and computer scientist
- Margaret Starbird (born 1942), American Christian writer
- Michael Starbird (born 1948), American mathematician
