= MacroMind =

Software company

- Industry: Software
- Founded: 1984; 42 years ago in Chicago, Illinois, United States
- Founders: Marc Canter; Jamie Fenton; Mark Stephen Pierce
- Fate: Merged with Paracomp
- Successors: MacroMind–Paracomp (1991); Macromedia (1992-2005); Adobe (2005-present)
- Headquarters: San Francisco, California, United States
- Products: See Products

MacroMind was an Apple Macintosh software company founded in Chicago in 1984 by Marc Canter, Jamie Fenton and Mark Stephen Pierce. The company's first product was SoundVision, a combined music and graphics editor. Before the release, the graphics editor was removed, and SoundVision became MusicWorks and the animation creativity tool VideoWorks (which later became Director). Along with other early programs, MusicWorks and VideoWorks were originally published and distributed by Hayden Software.

In 1988 the company moved to San Francisco, and in 1991 MacroMind merged with Paracomp to become MacroMind–Paracomp, then in 1992 merged with Authorware Inc., forming Macromedia.

== Products ==
- MusicWorks (1984) - music composer
- VideoWorks (1985), VideoWorks II (1987) and VideoWorks Interactive - multimedia animation software
- Art Grabber/Body Shop (1985) - clip art software
- Comic Works/Graphic Works - object based paint program
- VideoWorks accelerator - animation compiler for VideoWorks files
- MazeWars+ (1987) - multiplayer network game based on the classic Maze War
- Director (1987) - new name for VideoWorks II
- Director 2 (1988) - VideoWorks Interactive when released as a commercial product
- Director 2.2 (1989 - Introduction of Lingo (programming language), an extensible animation scripting language
- Director 3 (1989), and introduction of XObjects
- Three-D (1990) - 3D modeling and animation software
- MacroModel
- Renderworks (1990) - rendering software for Three-D files MacroMind at Google Books
- Fireworks (1990) - post-production software for Renderworks renderings
- Mouse Practice (1992) – a tutorial on how to use the mouse where the user controls a scuba diver

== See also ==
- Marc Canter - CEO and co-founder of MacroMind
