= Paracomp =

- Type: software
- Products: Milo
- Services: 3D software; Swivel 3D; ModelShop; FilmMaker
- Parent: Macintosh

Paracomp was a Macintosh programming company known for their 3D software, Swivel 3D and ModelShop and FilmMaker. FilmMaker was known for its packaging which was a 16 mm film reel tin, which was used to contain the software and manuals. Paracomp was also the publisher of the computer algebra system Milo, which was the first program on Macintosh able to perform symbolic computation using standard math notation. Paracomp was acquired by MacroMind in 1991 to briefly form MacroMind-Paracomp, before adding Authorware in 1992 and becoming Macromedia.
