= J. D. Lasica =

American journalist

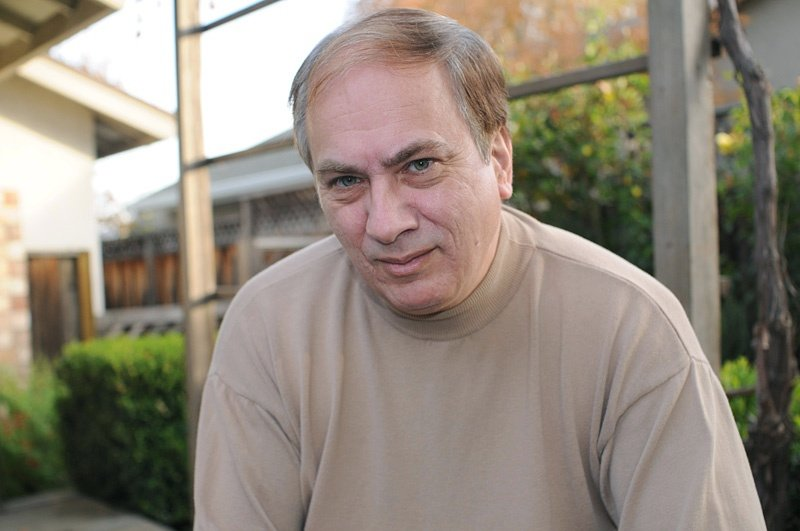
- J. D. Lasica (2008)
- Born: Joseph Daniel Lasica; Passaic, New Jersey, U.S.
- Education: Rutgers University (BA)
- Occupations: Author, journalist, entrepreneur, public speaker
- Notable work: Darknet: Hollywood's War Against the Digital Generation

Joseph Daniel "J.D." Lasica is an American entrepreneur, author, public speaker and journalist. He has co-founded several tech startups with a focus on artificial intelligence and has written several books about media and technology.

== Early life and education ==
Lasica was born in Passaic, New Jersey and grew up in Elmwood Park, N.J. He graduated from Rutgers University, where he earned a BA in communication. He is married to Mary, and the couple has a son.

== Journalism and media career ==
He began working in journalism in the 1980s as an editor and columnist at the Sacramento Bee.

He left newspapers in 1997 to join Microsoft's Sidewalk.com city guide as copy chief and managing editor. From 1997 to 2005, he wrote for publications such as the American Journalism Review (its first new media columnist), the Online Journalism Review (chief columnist), the Industry Standard, and Engadget. He also edited the white paper We Media: How Audiences Are Shaping the Future of News and Information for the American Press Institute.

He received a Knight News Challenge grant for his project Community Media Toolset and contributed to training modules for citizen journalists through the Center for Citizen Media.

== Entrepreneurship and AI ==
In 2005 Lasica co-founded Ourmedia, one of the first grassroots video-hosting communities, with Marc Canter. He later founded Socialmedia.biz, a consulting firm, and in 2009 launched Socialbrite.org, a learning center for nonprofits. He was also admitted to the Intel Insiders, a group of technology experts who advised Intel on social media and emerging tech trends.

His subsequent ventures included the Agile Travel Group, which launched Cruiseable, an AI-powered cruise discovery platform, as well as BingeBooks, a book discovery service backed by authors that uses artificial intelligence to provide recommendations. He also co-founded Authors A.I., a company offering AI manuscript analysis through its proprietary system Marlowe.

== Books ==
=== Non-fiction ===
- Darknet: Hollywood’s War Against the Digital Generation (2005; reissued 2025 as Whose Media Is It?)
- The Mobile Generation: Global Transformations at the Cellular Level (2007, Aspen Institute).
- Civic Engagement on the Move: How Mobile Media Can Serve the Public Good (2008, Aspen Institute).
- Identity in the Age of Cloud Computing (2009, Aspen Institute).

=== Fiction ===
- Biohack (2018)
- Catch and Kill (2019)
- Firefall (2022)
- The Golden Relic (2024)

== Public speaking ==
Lasica has spoken at international events including the United Nations (2012), Harvard’s Berkman Center, MIT, Princeton, Cannes Film Festival, SXSW, and Digital Hollywood.

== Recognition ==
His work in tech and media led to him being named one of the "Top 50 Silicon Valley Influencers" by NowPublic in 2008 and one of the "Top 100 Influencers in Social Media" by Social Technology Review in 2012.
