= LSD: Dream Emulator =

1998 video game

- Developer: OutSide Directors Company
- Publisher: Asmik Ace Entertainment
- Producer: Osamu Sato
- Designers: Osamu Sato; Satoshi Ashibe; Hiroko Nishikawa
- Programmer: Yoshinori Maeda
- Artists: Osamu Sato; Kazuhiro Goshima; Noboru Iizuka
- Composer: Osamu Sato
- Platform: PlayStation
- Release: JP: October 22, 1998
- Genres: Exploration game, Adventure, art
- Mode: Single-player

LSD: Dream Emulator is a 1998 exploration-adventure game by Asmik Ace Entertainment, released for the PlayStation. In LSD, the player explores surreal environments without any objective. If they touch anything in the environment, such as walls, creatures or objects, they will be warped to another setting. The game was conceived by Japanese artist Osamu Sato, who rejected the idea of games, and wanted to use the PlayStation as a medium for creating contemporary art. The game's concept is based on a dream diary kept by an Asmik Ace employee for over a decade.

The game received a limited release in Japan, alongside a soundtrack and a book composed of excerpts from the dream diary. LSD quickly fell into obscurity, but in years since has experienced a resurgence in popularity due to its eccentricity being a point of discussion on numerous gaming forums, as well as several Let's Play commentators. The game was also released on the Japanese PlayStation Store in 2010. Critics have praised its psychedelic and whimsical qualities, and LSD has been cited as one of the most experimental video games of all time.

== Gameplay ==
The game features a variety of surreal locations. This in-game screenshot shows rabbit and teddy bear non-playable characters wandering around such a location, specifically, Happy Town.

LSD: Dream Emulator is an exploration game that has been described as a "playable dream" in which the player explores surrealistic environments without any overarching goals. Gameplay takes place in a first-person perspective in a 3D environment with the player's control limited to moving frontward and backward, turning, strafing, running, and looking behind. The game is played in levels or "dreams" lasting up to ten minutes. The player begins each dream in a random area where they can begin exploring. By walking into any object or walking through certain tunnels, the player will be transported to another setting. LSD has several static and defined environments to explore including a Japanese village, a field, a city, houses, and a factory, among others. While the environments are static, the default textures are sometimes swapped and they may also be populated with random objects, animals, and characters roaming about to add variety. Each dream ends after ten minutes in which the character wakes up, or ends early if the player interacts with certain objects or dies.

After each dream, one day passes in the game, and the dream the player just experienced is marked on a graph. The graph rates dreams in relation to being an "Upper", "Downer", "Static", or "Dynamic" dream. As a player plays through more and more dreams, the game adds more variety to the dreams by changing textures more often. This results in the environments becoming more surreal and psychedelic over time. Sometimes when starting a new dream, a video is played or a short poem is shown instead of a playable dream. After a number of in-game days, a "flashback" option appears on the main menu which allows the player to experience an abbreviated version of the last dream they played. There is a humanoid figure, also known as the Gray or Shadow Man, which may appear in some dreams that, if touched by the player, prevents them from using the flashback option and undoes any progress made in the current dream.

== Development ==
LSD: Dream Emulator was conceived by Osamu Sato, a Japanese multimedia artist. Sato started his art career in photography and writing music in the 1980s, before turning to digital graphic design and computer art by the 1990s. In the 1990s, he began experimenting with CD-ROM technology, creating animated 3D videos with a dimension of interactivity. Although these projects resembled video games, Sato's intent was not to create games, but to use game platforms as a means of creating contemporary works of art. Sato's first such project was funded by Sony Music Entertainment Japan and released in 1994, titled Eastern Mind: The Lost Souls of Tong Nou. It was released in Japan and the United States. Because Eastern Mind was released in the United States and received some awards, Sato was able to source funding for his next project which would become LSD.

Sato still rejected the idea of video games and wanted to use the PlayStation game console as a medium for creating art and music. He chose the PlayStation as a platform because he felt Sony was already embracing elaborate concepts while he felt Sega and Nintendo had greater reputations as toy companies. Sato got the idea for LSD after playing racing games. He found racing games difficult and boring since he was not a skilled player, and so he imagined the possibilities of smashing the car into a wall and transporting the player to another dimension. He thought it would be more enjoyable for players like him that were unskilled at other games. From there, he got the idea of creating an imaginary world with the same irrationality and easily forgettable nature as dreams. He did not give the game any objectives because, according to him, they are not essential in video games since even natural human existence cannot be reduced to simple objectives. For inspiration, Sato pulled ideas from a dream diary written by Hiroko Nishikawa, a game designer at Asmik Ace Entertainment, who had been writing in the diary for about a decade.

As Sato is also a musician, he composed the game's soundtrack using samples to create around 500 musical patterns. He felt this approach more closely resembled the chaos of a dream state in contrast to full drawn-out melodies. He was particularly influenced from music coming out of England's Warp record label. Initially he was going to include more pentatonic scales and melodies to give the game an Asian flair, but he came to realize this was not necessary after seeing the international success of Japanese producers like Ken Ishii, who was later included on a remix soundtrack featuring some of the game's music. The title "LSD" is a reference to the drug of the same name, lysergic acid diethylamide, in a bid to attract the hippie and psychedelic subcultures. The acronym was not given any single interpretation in the game. Instead, there were many interpretations in the game such as "in Life, the Sensuous Dream" and "in Limbo, the Silent Dream". Sato felt this represented the chaos and confusion of dreams.

== Release ==
The game was released in Japan on October 22, 1998. Sato had hoped for an American release as with Eastern Mind, but he had no further say in localization. LSD sold few copies and now is rare to find on secondary markets, selling for high prices when it becomes listed for sale. It was re-released on the Japanese PlayStation Store on August 11, 2010. LSD was released as a standalone game and in a limited edition set which came with a bonus CD titled "Lucy in the Sky with Dynamites" and a book called "Lovely Sweet Dream". The CD contains about an hour of acid techno music and the book is composed of excerpts from Nishikawa's dream diary. The book has English translations of many dreams and illustrations provided by a wide variety of artists. Sato was adamant about releasing a special soundtrack, so a double-disc soundtrack compilation titled LSD and Remixes was issued alongside the game. It features remixes by Ken Ishii, Jimi Tenor, μ-Ziq, and Morgan Geist, among others. Sato released a new version of the soundtrack in 2019 with redone tracks.

== Reception ==
LSD: Dream Emulator quickly fell into obscurity after release due to its limited availability and the eccentric nature of its content, but it gained an avid cult following in subsequent years. The cause of its growing interest among Western audiences years after its release is a mystery to Sato. Motherboard wrote that its popularity is due to the Internet, primarily from appearances on humor blogs like Cracked.com and Let's Play video curators on YouTube who feed off the game's quirky qualities. Hardcore Gaming 101 concluded that the popularity of LSD is a testament to the consumer demand for hallucinogenic and experimental games. Enough people contacted Sony about LSD that they re-released it on the Japanese PlayStation Network in 2010, generating even more interest. Sato has noticed young audiences visiting his art exhibits because they heard about him due to LSD's online popularity. English indie rock band Alt-J received permission from Sato directly to use a screenshot from LSD for the cover art of their studio album, Relaxer (2017). In 2011, a fan began developing an unofficial remake made in the Unity engine for personal computers, with a public alpha version being made available in 2014.

Regarding the quality of the game itself, Kill Screen called LSD "one of the most unnerving and unpredictable weird video games ever made." Hardcore Gaming 101 said "there has never been another video game that so effectively conferred the feeling of an actual dream," and continued saying that the game is somewhat dated but is still worth experiencing. They compared the game to the comic series Little Nemo and The Sandman, the film Dreams, and Alice's Adventures in Wonderland as a work of art designed to emulate dreams. Red Bull Music Academy called it one of the most "experimental titles" in all of gaming. An English fan translation was released in 2020.
