= Mia's Language Adventure: The Kidnap Caper =

2003 video game

Mia's Language Adventure
- Cover Art
- Developer: Kutoka Interactive
- Publisher: Kutoka Interactive
- Series: Mia's Big Adventure Collection
- Engine: Macromedia Director
- Platforms: Windows, Macintosh
- Release: 2003
- Genre: Educational
- Modes: Adventure Mode, Activities Mode

Mia's Language Adventure: The Kidnap Caper is the fourth title of Mia's Big Adventure Collection software series created by Kutoka Interactive. Released in 2003 in Canada and the United States, the game teaches French and Spanish as a second language to children between 6 and 10 years old.

== Adventure ==
Mia's grandmother Mimi is kidnapped just after winning an arts contest. The player must help Mia find out who did it to free her.

== Activities ==
The game's 14 educational activities teach Basic vocabulary words (objects of everyday life, animals, fruits & vegetables, occupations, family members, etc.;) adjectives, verbs, numbers, prepositions, sentence structure, placing the adjective, verb tenses (present, past, future)

== Critical reception ==
The game received positive reviews from Review Corner, Commonsense Media, Washington Post, Chicago Parent, Boston Herald, and others.

== Awards ==
The game received the Parents' Choice Gold Award for 2004 in the software category, the National Parenting Center "Seal of Approval" for Spring 2004, the 2004 BESSIE award for the same year and several others.
