= QuarkImmedia =

- Developer(s): Quark, Inc.
- Stable release: 1.5
- Platform: MacOS Classic
- Type: Multimedia
- License: Proprietary
- Website: web.archive.org/web/19990128094835/www.quarkimmedia.com/quarkimmedia/

QuarkImmedia was an Internet and multimedia authoring and viewing application for Mac OS X and Windows, produced by Quark, Inc. Designed for use in conjunction with either QuarkXPress or QuarkXPress Passport it was primarily used for CD-ROM publishing, although many online micros sites were published, one such online site was for the Spice Girls for the promotion of the band and their hits.
