= Mia's Science Adventure: Romaine's New Hat =

2000 video game

Mia's Science Adventure
- Cover Art
- Developer: Kutoka Interactive
- Publisher: Kutoka Interactive
- Series: Mia's Big Adventure Collection
- Engine: Macromedia Director
- Platforms: Windows, Macintosh
- Release: 2000
- Genre: Educational
- Modes: Adventure Mode, Activities Mode

Mia's Science Adventure: Romaine's New Hat is the second title of the Mia's Big Adventure Collection software series created by Kutoka Interactive. Released in 2000 in Canada and the United States, the game teaches sciences to children between 6 and 10 years old.

== Adventure ==
Mia lost her mother's hat to the rat Romaine. The player helps her on a quest to find it, buy it back and return home safely.

== Activities ==
The game's 12 educational activities teach about plants and their parts; animals, their habitats, eating habits and classification; weather, clouds; the Solar System; earth science; the human body and its systems; heat energy; properties of matter fossils; electricity and magnetism.

== Critical reception ==
Mia's Science Adventure received positive reviews from the Los Angeles Times, USA Today.com, eToys.com, Parent's Choice, National Parenting Center, Review Corner and others on account of the value of its educational contents, graphics, story and appeal to children.

== Reception ==
Reception

Review score
| Publication | Score |
|---|---|
| Review Corner | 4.5/5 |

Award
| Publication | Award |
|---|---|
| Review Corner | Award of Excellence |

The game received several awards such as the National Parenting Center's "Seal of Approval", the Coalition for Quality Children's Media's "Kids First Endorsement", Parents' Choice's "Gold Award".
