= Didi & Ditto =

- Genre: Edutainment
- Developer: Kutoka Interactive

Didi & Ditto is an edutainment software series created in 2003 by Kutoka Interactive. The series consists in three grade-based titles for preschool (ages 2 to 4), kindergarten (ages 4 to 6) and first grade (ages 5 to 7).

== Gameplay ==
After the player picks either Didi (the red beaver girl) or Ditto (the blue beaver boy), an introductory cinematic tells a story and sets the player's mission. The mission consists in exploring Didi & Ditto's interactive world to collect a number of items by winning educational activities. Collecting all the items means completing the mission and seeing the conclusion cinematic.

The difficulty level set by the player at the beginning of the game corresponds to different and more challenging question sets in the educational activities. Optionally, the player may bypass the entire entertainment part of the game and enter a menu of all educational activities.

== Didi & Ditto's world ==
Didi and Ditto are two beavers living in Jako's Valley, a fantastic and colourful world. Living in the Valley are several characters that appear in each game:

- Zolt: He is a purple vegetarian wolf.
- HipHop: He is a fast-moving yellow rabbit.
- Couki: He is a curious puppy always putting his nose where it will disturb Grumpy Bug.
- Grumpy Bug: He is an old grumpy bug who likes to be left alone. He is kind of a hermit.
- Hootdini: He is a magician owl. For some reason, his magic tricks never seem to produce the expected result.
- Ouisy: He is a prairie dog with an odd laugh.
- Venus: She is a blue and white chicken who has not yet given up on trying to fly.
- Blue Bear: He is a timid blue bear who's always hiding behind a tree or a rock.
- Fly Guy: He is an athletic insect who dreams of making it to the Olympics.
- Tiny Turtle: She is a blue turtle with a red shell.
- Comedy Ann: She is the Whoopi Goldberg of Jako's Valley.
- Frank Frog: He is singing green frog.

== Titles in the series ==
=== A Feast for Zolt ===
- Developer: Kutoka Interactive
- Publisher: Kutoka Interactive
- Series: Didi & Ditto
- Engine: Macromedia Director
- Platforms: Windows, Macintosh
- Release: NA: 2003
- Genre: Educational
- Modes: Adventure Mode, Activities Mode

Didi & Ditto Kindergarten: A Feast for Zolt is the first title of the Didi & Ditto educational software series created by Kutoka Interactive. Release in 2003 in Canada and the United States, the game teaches kindergarten notions to children between 4 and 6 years old. The player, taking the role of either Didi or Ditto at the game's beginning, must collect six fruits and six vegetables in exchange for freeing the other sibling.

The educational activities contained in the game cover math skills (recognizing numbers, counting objects, adding, solving math problems), reading skills (recognizing letters, building vocabulary, phonic skills, identifying rhyming words, following oral directions, listening comprehension, sequencing), thinking skills (distinguishing between patterns, distinguishing between shapes, extending patterns, using shapes, visual and audio memory practice, problem solving) and creativity (coloring, music).

The game received numerous positive reviews from Macworld, Games4Girls, Common Sense Media, Edutaining Kids, MobyGames, Game Vortex, and others.

The game received several awards on account of its educational value, its appeal to children and the quality of its design and graphics.

- 2004 - BESSIES 10th Annual Best Educational Software Awards
- 2004 - Parents' Choice Gold Award
- 2004 - Seal of Approval - The National Parenting Center

=== The Wolf King ===
- Developer: Kutoka Interactive
- Publisher: Kutoka Interactive
- Series: Didi & Ditto
- Engine: Macromedia Director
- Platforms: Windows, Macintosh
- Release: NA: 2005
- Genre: Educational

Didi & Ditto First Grade: The Wolf King is the second title of Didi & Ditto educational software series created by Kutoka Interactive. Release in late 2005 in Canada and the United States, the game teaches first grade notions to children between 5 and 7 years old. Didi & Ditto's home, Jako's Valley, is invaded by the Wolf king and his Wolf lieutenants. The player, as either Didi (girl) or Ditto (boy), sets out to win his country's freedom back by outsmarting every single one of the king's lieutenants.

The 16 educational activities contained in the game cover addition and subtraction; shapes and forms; letters, spelling, rhymes, and nouns; identifying, classifying, and sorting objects; map reading; color mixing; creating and playing music; drawing; and problem solving.

The game received positive reviews from Common Sense Media, Games4Girls, Moby Games, Game Vortex, and About.com.

=== Mother Nature's Visit ===
Didi & Ditto Preschool: Mother Nature's Visit is the third game in the series.

== Technology ==
All Didi & Ditto's games were developed with the Macromedia (later Adobe) Director multimedia application authoring platform.

The in-game animations were made with Softimage XSI before they were imported as sprites inside Director. The animated 3D cinematics are also made with Softimage's technology and exported as QuickTime movies.
