= Quark (company) =

American software company

Quark Software, Inc.
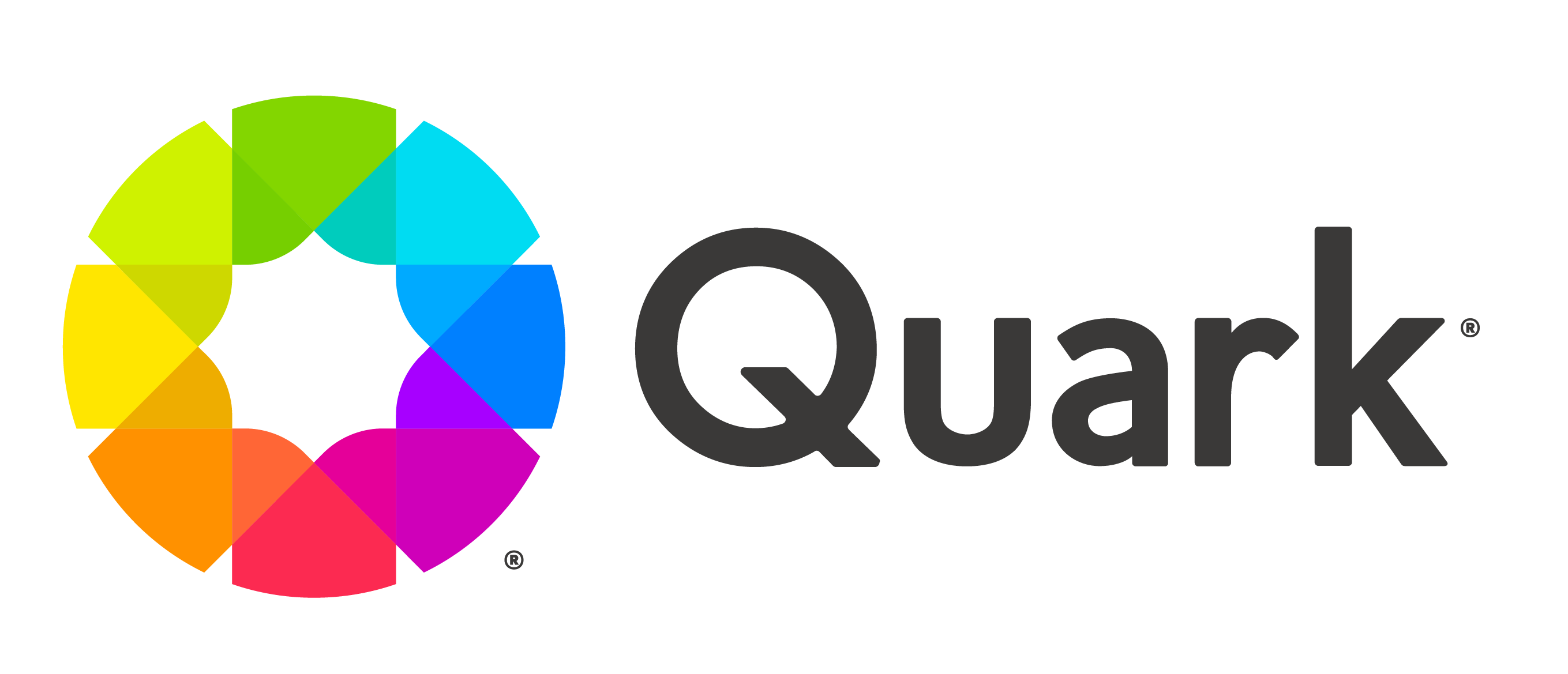
- Logo since 2021
- Type: Private
- Industry: Computer software
- Founded: 1981; 45 years ago in Denver, Colorado, United States
- Founder: Tim Gill; Mark Pope
- Headquarters: Grand Rapids, Michigan, United States
- Area served: Worldwide
- Key people: Martin Owen (CEO)
- Products: Enterprise content lifecycle management with Quark Publishing Platform NextGen, graphic design & desktop publishing with QuarkXPress, sales enablement & content intelligence with Quark Docurated
- Services: SaaS
- Owner: Zax.ai
- Website: quark.com

Quark Software Inc. is an American privately-owned software company which specializes in enterprise publishing software for automating the production of customer communications. The company's original goal was to "create software that would be the platform for publishing", just as quarks are the basis for all matter.

Founded in 1981, the company is best known for its desktop page layout and design software, QuarkXPress, although this has now become secondary to its other products and services.

== History ==
Quark was founded with $2,000 in 1981 in Denver, Colorado, U.S. Between 1981 and 1985, their primary products were Word Juggler and Catalyst. Word Juggler was the first word processor on the Apple III. Catalyst was a program that was distributed bundled with the Apple IIe, and allowed users to run floppy disk–based applications from their hard drive. They also attempted a product line called "Quark Peripherals", but the market for storage devices at the time resulted in a huge financial loss. The devices released, the "QC10" and "QC20", were 10 and 20MB hard disk drives, respectively, that could be used with the Apple IIe or IIc, the Apple /// or III+, or the Macintosh (notably, via the Macintosh's floppy disk drive port). The QC10 retailed for US$1,295.00 in October 1985.

Logo used c. 1987 to c. 2000

Logo used from c. 2000 to 2005

In March 1987, Quark released QuarkXPress 1.0, which due to its precision quickly gained market share from Aldus PageMaker. With the release of QuarkXPress 3.0 in 1990, Quark quickly achieved a dominant position in the desktop publishing market and became the standard for desktop publishing. By the end of the 1990s, it had gathered a market share of around 90%.

In the late 1990s, Quark faced intense criticism for slow innovation cycles, high prices, and a poor response to customer needs. Therefore, many customers welcomed the release of Adobe InDesign in 1999 as a viable alternative. The release of Adobe Creative Suite in 2003, essentially including InDesign with Photoshop and Illustrator, resulted in ongoing market share loss for QuarkXPress.

As a result, under the new leadership of Raymond Schiavone, Quark started to refocus its resources towards the enterprise dynamic publishing market (now Content Automation), announcing a new strategy in March 2008.

Quark acquired A Lowly Apprentice Productions (ALAP), which provides extended technology for the publishing and graphic design industries, in 2005.

In 2008, Quark Software acquired an XML editor vendor In.vision Research Corporation. It also acquired Gluon in 2010, a New Jersey–based software company that develops tools for the corporate and publishing industries.

On May 29, 2012, Quark acquired Mobile IQ, with digital publishing technology for tablet devices named PressRun, later renamed to App Studio.

In 2017, Quark acquired Docurated, a New York–based creator of sales and marketing software. for an undisclosed amount. Docurated’s CEO and founder Alex Gorbansky joined Quark’s executive team.

In 2022, the company opened new offices in Birmingham, UK, and Dublin, Ireland.

Quark was listed in 2023 UK’s Best Workplaces in Tech list and won Bronze Stevie Award in the Content Management Solution category in the 21st Annual American Business Awards.

=== Ownership and management ===
Quark was founded under the name "Quark Engineering" in 1981 by Tim Gill and Mark Pope. In 1986, Fred Ebrahimi joined Quark as CEO and co-owner. In 1990, Mark Pope sold his share of the company to the other partners. In 2000, Tim Gill left Quark and sold all his shares to Ebrahimi.

Logo used from 2005 to 2006

Logo used from 2006 to 2017

In keeping with its India focus, Quark appointed Kamar Aulakh, a Quark veteran of Indian origin, as its CEO in February 2004. In June 2005, Quark informed its employees that Aulakh was no longer with the company.

At the end of 2006, Fred Ebrahimi gave all his shares of Quark Inc. to his children, with his daughter Sasha Ebrahimi taking the position of chairman.

On November 1, 2006, Quark appointed Raymond Schiavone, former CEO of Arbortext, as its new CEO.

On August 9, 2011, the Ebrahimi family sold all their shares to Platinum Equity, a California-based private equity firm.

Logo used from 2017 to 2021

Parallax Capital Partners subsequently acquired Quark Software Inc. from Platinum Equity on July 12, 2017.

On June 1, 2021, Quark appointed Martin Owen, former SVP of Products at Erwin (now Quest Software), as its new CEO.

The company was acquired by Zax.ai in April 2026.

== Products ==
Quark's first products were word processing software for the Apple II and Apple III. In 1987, it released its best known product, QuarkXPress, for Apple Macintosh. In 1992, it also released the product for Microsoft Windows.

In the 1990s, QuarkXPress 3.x gained around 90% market share of page layout applications. Its editorial workflow system, called Quark Publishing System, sold almost a thousand times to magazines and newspapers.

The company announced a picture editing application, QuarkXPosure, which was never released, and a multimedia authoring add-on XTension for QuarkXPress, QuarkImmedia. Neither is part of Quark's portfolio anymore. The company briefly purchased and marketed a standalone multimedia authoring program, mTropolis, before discontinuing it in the late 1990s.

Quark acquired two companies creating add-ons for QuarkXPress and InDesign, ALAP in 2005 and Gluon in 2010.

Reflecting a shift towards Web-based word-processing tools such as Office 365 and Google Docs, in November 2014, Quark announced the release of a new authoring tool, Quark Author.

Current software products
Name	Icon	Type
Quark Publishing Platform NextGen		Enterprise content lifecycle management and content automation platform
Quark Docurated		Sales enablement and content intelligence platform
Quark XML Author		XML-based structured content authoring editor for Microsoft Word
Quark Author		XML-based structured content authoring editor for Web browsers
QuarkXPress		Graphic design and desktop publishing tool
QuarkXPress CopyDesk		Collaborative editorial and publishing workflows for streamlining and automating copy and design processes
Quark App Publishing Studio		Convert print publications into web and native iOS and Android Apps
