= MTropolis =

mTropolis (pronounced "metropolis") was an open-architecture multimedia programming application aimed at enabling rapid development of multimedia titles. It was developed by mFactory (pronounced "em-factory") and introduced in 1995. It introduced object-oriented concepts such as reusable objects, modifiers and behaviors into the multimedia authoring space dominated by Macromedia's Director software. mTropolis was bought in 1997 by Quark, which moved development from Burlingame, California to Denver and then cancelled the product one year later. Despite efforts by its fervent users to attempt to save their investment and beloved tool, negotiations and even a possible purchase offer never came to fruition.

== History ==
mTropolis competed in the interactive multimedia product space dominated in the 1990s by Macromedia Director. The software's maker, mFactory, founded in 1992, variously positioned mTropolis as an alternative and as an adjunct to Director.

mTropolis was bought by Quark in 1997. The use of behaviors in mTropolis spurred Macromedia on to introduce behaviors in Director 6.0.

I was there when Seery, Shepherd, meself and probably Greggy went over to the Mtrop user meetings. We straight out stole [behaviors] from them.

- Alex Zavatone (ex Macromedia) on the Direct-L Mailing List, Tue, 9 Sep 2008

While multimedia CD-ROM authoring has largely been rendered irrelevant by online content distribution, mTropolis remains an interesting study in application design, and held a loyal following for many years.

== Paradigm ==
The development environment was very different from the other tools around at the time - Apple Computer's HyperCard, Pitango Clickworks and others had a card based metaphor, and Macromedia Director had a film metaphor (the content area is called The Stage, the time line The Score, an assets library named The Cast, etc.). In mTropolis there were sections, subsections, and scenes. Assets would be placed onto the scene, and then combinations of behaviors and modifiers would be dragged onto the assets.

Powerful interaction and animation could be created by making different modifiers send messages to each other, allowing a user to create something impressive fairly quickly, without any typing. There was a simple programming language, accessed via a Miniscript modifier, but most of the programming was achieved by attaching standard behaviors and modifiers, and making selections within the modifier pop-up menus.

== Technical Issues ==
According to Starship Titanic author Douglas Adams, his team had originally selected mTropolis 1.0 for its development platform but it had to be abandoned for unspecified technical insufficiencies in favor of an in-house tool.

=== Miniscript Limitations ===
One criticism of the tool was that the integrated programming language, Miniscript, was lacking key features necessary for common tasks. Because mTropolis was conceived around a visual programming metaphor, mFactory engineers intentionally omitted control constructs such as conditional loops. To remedy such limitations, the third-party developer AX Logic produced the commercially available Alien Studio modifier as a drop-in replacement for Miniscript.

=== File Format ===
The advent in version 1.1 of the mTropolis browser plug-in for Netscape Navigator, dubbed mPire, exposed a core architectural shortcoming. The binary file format was not cross-platform; in order to make a mTropolis element available for embedding on a web page, the author was required to save a Macintosh version and a separate Windows version. Hence the web server had to store redundant copies of the same content, consuming disk space and necessitating the use of loader pages to serve the file appropriate for the end user's operating system.

=== Macintosh-Only Authoring ===
While playback engines existed for both the Macintosh and Windows platforms, the mTropolis authoring system itself only ran on the Mac.

== Release history ==
=== mTropolis 1.0 ===
January 1995: Released at MacWorld San Francisco. Retail price $4,495.

=== mTropolis 1.1 ===
May 1996: Added support for QuickTime VR 1.0. Retail price $1,195.

October 1996: mFactory releases beta 1 of the mPire browser plug-in.

=== mTropolis 2.0 ===
March 1997: mFactory announces pre-order sales availability for version 2.0, due to ship in "the second half of May." Retail price $995.

May 1997: Quark, Inc. purchases mFactory.

March 1998: Quark announces that v2.0 would be furnished free-of-charge to registered mTropolis v1 customers, but that the product will not be made available for general purchase.
