= Macromedia Director =

Deprecated multimedia application authoring platform

Director

- Director 11.5 running on Windows 7
- Original authors: MacroMind; Macromedia
- Developers: MacroMind (1985–1992); Macromedia (1992–2005); Adobe (2005–2017)
- Final release: 12 / February 11, 2013; 13 years ago
- Operating system: Windows and OS X
- Type: Computer animation
- License: Trialware
- Website: www.adobe.com/products/director.html

Macromedia Director (formerly MacroMind Director and MacroMind VideoWorks, later Adobe Director) is a multimedia application authoring platform created by Macromedia (formerly MacroMind) and managed by Adobe Systems until its discontinuation.

Director was the primary editor on the Adobe Shockwave platform, which dominated the interactive multimedia product space during the 1990s. Various graphic adventure games were developed with Director during the 1990s, including The Journeyman Project, Total Distortion, Eastern Mind: The Lost Souls of Tong Nou, Mia's Language Adventure, Mia's Science Adventure, and the Didi & Ditto series. Hundreds of free online video games were developed using Lingo, and published on websites such as Miniclip and Shockwave.com.

Director published DCR files that were played using the Adobe Shockwave Player, in addition to compiling native executables for Microsoft Windows and Mac OS X. Director allowed users to build applications on a movie metaphor, with the user as the "director" of the movie. Originally designed for creating animation sequences, the addition of a scripting language called Lingo made it a popular choice for creating CD-ROMs, standalone kiosks and internet video games content during the 1990s.

On January 27, 2017, Adobe announced that it was discontinuing Director. Sales of Director ceased on February 1, 2017; ongoing updates and support for the software ended on March 14, 2017.

== Features ==
Director applications are authored on a timeline, similar to Adobe Flash. Director supports graphical primitives and playback controls such as video players, 3D content players, and Flash players. Director includes a scripting language called Lingo, and plug-in applications called Xtras, which are similar in functionality and design to ActiveX. Director supports a graphical user interface framework with basic controls and allows interaction with external files and certain Windows APIs. Director has been used to create applications, 2D and 3D video games, self-running kiosks, and CDs and DVD launchers. Director supports many different images, audio, and video formats.

=== Lingo ===
Director includes a scripting language called Lingo, and a suite of 2D image manipulation tools referred to as "imaging Lingo". This subset of Lingo allows authors to perform advanced operations such as to bitblit. While a vast majority of users rely on the score timeline for the development of their work, a number of expert developers create stunning projects, such as games, that take advantage of the speed of imaging Lingo. These advanced projects typically use only 1 frame on the score timeline using Lingo to control animation and interaction. Director 8.5 added the ability to import, manipulate, and display 3D objects. The 3D features were quite advanced for the time, unusual for an authoring environment. The 3D capability includes the ability to create geometry on the fly from code, hardware accelerated model display, and advanced lighting features. It also supports vector graphics and 3D interactivity through a Shockwave 3D file object. Since Version 6, Director has supported the import of Flash animation files and Lingo can be used to interact with Flash's Actionscript code for more control.

=== Xtras ===
One of the most powerful aspects of Director is its extensibility, which is achieved through plug-in applications named Xtras. For example, there are Xtras for OS desktop manipulations (creating folders, files, icons, shortcuts, registry editing) and Shell control, dedicated text processing (RegX), PDF readers, and many more. With Xtras, Director can be extended to support additional media types beyond those that the stock version of the software allows. These can be created by users or purchased from third-party vendors. They are created using Adobe Director's XDK (Xtra Development Kit), a C++ SDK. With the change in new versions of Director, Xtra developers need to modify their products to maintain ongoing support. With changing industry trends, many third-party Xtra developers have discontinued products and dropped support due to the cost of development without a significant return.

=== Publishing ===
For online distribution, the Director can publish projects for embedding in websites using the Shockwave plugin. Shockwave files have a .dcr file extension. Other publishing options include a stand-alone executable file called projectors, supported on Macintosh and Windows operating systems, and with Director 12, output for iOS. Early versions also supported execution of the 3DO console. The Director score timeline can also be exported as a non-interactive video format, such as a QuickTime or sequence of images.

== Comparison with Flash ==
The differences between Director and Flash have been the subject of much discussion, especially in the Director development community. Extensibility is one of the main differences between the two, as are some of the sundry codecs that can be imported. Because of its primary use of raster graphics as opposed to the primarily vector graphics in Flash, the files output from Director were expectedly larger than Flash files, which put it at a considerable disadvantage in the days when most people accessed the web through dial-up connections. Because of this and a steeper learning curve for Director developers, Director's ubiquity as the leader of authoring tools quickly gave way to Flash, especially in the critical window of 1998–2000. Additionally, Macromedia partnered with distributors such as Dell, Apple, etc. to have the Flash plugin pre-installed on machines for users, so that they would not be prompted to install any additional software. At that point in time (1998–2000), broadband internet access was not the norm for most users, and the fivefold difference in size was significant.

== History ==
Director started out as MacroMind "VideoWorks", an application for the original Macintosh. Animations were initially limited to the black and white of early Macintosh screens.

The name was changed to "Director" in 1987, with the addition of new capabilities and the Lingo scripting language in 1988. A Windows version was available in the early 1990s.

From 1995 to 1997, a competing multimedia authoring program called mTropolis (from mFactory). In 1997, mTropolis was purchased and buried by Quark, Inc., who had its own plans into multimedia authoring with QuarkImmedia.

=== Product Timeline ===
- 1985: VideoWorks
- 1987: Named Director 1.0
- 1993: Macromind Director became Macromedia Director (v 3.1.3)
- 1994: Macromedia Director 4 was released (Windows and Mac PowerPC support)
- 1995: Macromedia Shockwave Director 4.0.1 was released in January for Windows (Mac support in later release)
- 1996: Macromedia Director 5 was released (MOA and Xtras)
- 1997: Macromedia Director 6 was released (Shockwave integration, behavior & mp3 support)
- 1998: Macromedia Director 6.5 was released (QuickTime 3 support & Xtra integration)
- November 16, 1998: Macromedia Director 7 was released (engine rewrite)
- 2000: Macromedia Director 8 was released
- 2001: Macromedia Director 8.5 was released (Shockwave3D)
- 2002: Macromedia Director MX was released (also known as Director 9)
- January 5, 2004: Macromedia Director MX 2004 was released (also known as Director 10)
- March 25, 2008: Adobe Director 11 was released
- March 23, 2009: Adobe Director 11.5 was released
- September 6, 2010: Adobe Director 11.5.8 was released
- August 18, 2011: Adobe Director 11.5.9 was released
- February 11, 2013: Adobe Director 12 was released
- January 27, 2017: Adobe Director end-of-life announcement
- February 1, 2017: Adobe Director removed from market
- March 14, 2017: Ongoing updates and support for Adobe Shockwave on Mac devices ends

=== Adobe Director ===
Logo of Director under ownership of Adobe

The first Director release under the Adobe brand (v. 11), released after a gap of four years, featured DirectX 9 and Unicode support and extended 3D capabilities based on the NVIDIA PhysX engine, as well as bitmap filters, enhanced video, audio and image file formats support, and Adobe Flash CS3 integration. Shockwave Player 11 was also released.

Version 11.5 added 5.1 channel surround sound audio capabilities, real-time mixing, audio effects and DSP filters. Also, there is added support for H.264-video integration for full-screen and high-definition playback. Other supported formats include: 3D importer for Google SketchUp, streaming support using RTMP and ByteArray datatypes.

== Notable uses ==
- Adobe Director was used by Bas Ording, an Apple human interface designer, to prototype the iPad software keyboard.
- Adobe Director was used by Eugéne Visser, a multi-media designer, from 1996 to 2017 with a display of games and presentations in the corporate world, either as promotional gaming or as intent applications to utilize.
- The video game Rain World (as well as its predecessor Freethinker) began development in Adobe Director before switching to Unity due to technical limitations by Director. Its level editor remained in Adobe Director.
