= BloodRayne (film) =

2005 film by Uwe Boll

- Theatrical release poster
- Directed by: Uwe Boll
- Written by: Guinevere Turner
- Based on: BloodRayne by Majesco and Terminal Reality
- Produced by: Daniel Clarke; Shawn Williamson
- Starring: Kristanna Loken; Michelle Rodriguez; Michael Madsen; Matthew Davis; Geraldine Chaplin; Will Sanderson; Udo Kier; Billy Zane; Meat Loaf; Ben Kingsley
- Cinematography: Mathias Neumann
- Edited by: David Richardson
- Music by: Henning Lohner
- Production companies: Herold Productions; Pitchblack Pictures Inc.; Boll Kino
- Distributed by: Boll KG Productions
- Release dates: 23 October 2005 (AFF); 6 January 2006 (United States); 14 September 2006 (Germany)
- Running time: 95 minutes
- Countries: United States; Germany
- Language: English
- Budget: $25 million
- Box office: $3.7 million

BloodRayne is a 2005 action film directed by Uwe Boll, from a screenplay written by Guinevere Turner. It is based on the video game franchise of the same name, from Majesco and game developer Terminal Reality, of which it acts as a loose prequel to the first game. It is also the third video game film adaptation made by Boll, who previously made House of the Dead and Alone in the Dark. The film stars Kristanna Loken and Michelle Rodriguez, alongside Michael Madsen, Matthew Davis, Will Sanderson, Billy Zane, Udo Kier, Michael Paré, Meat Loaf, Ben Kingsley, and Geraldine Chaplin.

BloodRayne had its world premiere at the Austin Film Festival on October 23, 2005, and was released in the United States on January 6, 2006, and in Germany on September 14, 2006. It received negative reviews and grossed $3.7 million.

The film was followed by two sequels: BloodRayne 2: Deliverance (2007) and BloodRayne: The Third Reich (2011). Both of these sequels were also met with negative reviews.

== Plot ==
Rayne is an unholy breed of human and vampire, known simply as a "dhampir". Dhampirs, with a diminished thirst for human blood, are unaffected by crucifixes but maintain a weakness to holy water. Rayne is the daughter of Kagan, a vampire king, who has gathered an army of thralls, both vampire and human, in order to annihilate the human race. Rayne was conceived when Kagan raped her mother, who was murdered when she refused to hand Rayne over to him.

Sebastian, Vladimir, and Katarin are members of the "Brimstone Society", a group of warriors sworn to fight against vampires. The trio hear of Rayne working as a carnival freak against her will. Suspecting Rayne's lineage as a dhampir, Vladimir plans to recruit her in order to overthrow Kagan. Kagan is also hunting for Rayne, fearing she will interfere with his plans.

Rayne escapes captivity when an abusive caretaker tries to rape her. On the road, Rayne encounters and saves a family being attacked by vampires. A fortune teller reveals to Rayne that Kagan has become the most powerful vampire in Romania and resides in a well-protected castle. She tells Rayne that Kagan seeks an ancient talisman, a mystical eye, and if she finds it, the eye will allow her to gain an audience with him. Rayne sets out to the monastery, where the eye is hidden, in order to find it.

Rayne shelters for the night at the monastery and later sneaks away to where the talisman is guarded by a hammer-wielding, deformed monk, who she kills. Booby traps further protect the talisman, and when Rayne lifts it from its pedestal, the chamber floods with holy water. As Rayne hangs from the ceiling to avoid the water, the talisman falls from the box, but she catches the eyeball. Examining it closely, the eye magically becomes absorbed into her own eye, and when she falls into the water, she is somehow unaffected by it.

When she leaves the chamber, the monks explain the artifact is one of three body parts which came from an ancient vampire called Belial, who had found a way to overcome the weaknesses of a vampire. The eye overcomes holy water, the rib overcomes the cross, and the heart overcomes sunlight. When Belial died, the parts of his body were hidden across the land. As Kagan desires all these parts in order to assume Belial's powers, it becomes the heroes' mission to stop him.

Rayne is brought to the headquarters of the Brimstone Society and they agree to work together to kill Kagan. Katarin does not trust Rayne and betrays Brimstone to her father, Elrich, who has fallen in league with Kagan, but seeks to betray him and gain power for himself. The location of the heart talisman is known to Katarin as her grandfather hid it in water-filled caves. She seeks it out but Rayne kills her and takes it. With the talisman, Rayne attempts to gain an audience before Kagan, but he takes the heart and throws her in the dungeon. He plans to extract the eye as part of a ritual. He realizes too late that Rayne had only given him an empty box and not the heart.

Sebastian and Vladimir intervene, battling Kagan and his minions, but both are fatally wounded, leaving Rayne in a final battle against Kagan. As Sebastian dies, he fires a final bolt from his crossbow, but Kagan is too quick and is able to catch it. Rayne is able to summon her last reserves of strength and plunge the bolt into his heart. As she tends to Sebastian, he chooses to die rather than let Rayne save him.

In the aftermath of the battle, Rayne sits on her father's throne, reflecting on the events that have transpired. Rayne later departs the castle alone and rides off into the mountains.

== Cast ==
- Kristanna Loken as Rayne, a dhampir who seeks to kill her father, Kagan.
- Michelle Rodriguez as Katarin, a member of the Brimstone Society who distrusts Rayne.
- Michael Madsen as Vladimir, a senior member of the Brimstone Society.
- Ben Kingsley as Kagan, the King of Vampires and Rayne's father.
- Matthew Davis as Sebastian, a member of the Brimstone Society who bonds with Rayne.
- Will Sanderson as Domastir
- Geraldine Chaplin as Fortune Teller
- Udo Kier as Regal Monk
- Meat Loaf as Leonid, a hedonistic vampire lord tasked with keeping Rayne imprisoned, and who is subsequently killed by the Brimstone Society.
- Michael Paré as Iancu
- Billy Zane as Elrich, father of Katarin and a powerful nobleman. He has fallen in league with Kagan, but secretly desires to take his power for himself. Zane described it as a pleasure to work with such a decisive director.

== Production ==
Screenwriter Guinevere Turner turned in the first draft two weeks late. Rather than ask for redrafts, Boll accepted it and then made many of his own changes; he then asked the actors to "take a crack at it". Turner estimated only 20% of her script was actually filmed.

Filming took place in Romania, in the Carpathian Mountains. Filming also took place in a castle where Prince Vlad the Impaler presumably spent a night once.

== Reception ==
BloodRayne was first shown at the Austin Film Festival on October 23, 2005.

The film opened in 985 theaters across the United States on 6 January 2006. It was originally to have played at up to 2,500 theaters, but that number dropped to 1,600 and ended up lower due to prints being shipped to theaters that had not licensed the film.

Billy Zane was involved with distributor Romar Entertainment and Uwe Boll later sued him for revenue owed.

=== Box office ===
In its opening, the film only made US$1,550,000. The film ended up grossing US$3,591,980 (June 2006) against a production budget of US$25 million.

=== Critical response ===
On Rotten Tomatoes, it has a 4% approval rating based on 53 reviews, with an average rating of 2.9/10. The site's consensus reads: "BloodRayne is an absurd sword-and-sorcery vid-game adaptation from schlock-maestro Uwe Boll, featuring a distinguished (and slumming) cast." It was ranked 48th in Rotten Tomatoes's 100 worst reviewed films of the 2000s. On Metacritic it has a weighted average score of 18% based on 13 reviews, summarizing the reviews as "overwhelming dislike".

Joe Leydon of Variety said that the film "lurches from incident to incident at a graceless plodding place, offering little in the way of genuine excitement—the swordfights often are confusingly cut and choreographed—and only minimal amounts of guilty-pleasure titillation". Maitland McDonagh of TV Guide wrote: "Though indisputably the best of Uwe Boll's first three video-game-into-film adaptations, this gory, ludicrous horror-action picture isn't good by any standard". Critics ridiculed Boll for hiring actual prostitutes instead of actors for a scene featuring Meat Loaf in order to save on production costs.

Berge Garabedian of JoBlo's movie reviews described as the film as "actually pretty decent .. for what it is", namely a video game adaptation, with a hot lead actress in the form of Kristanna Loken and a number of surprisingly fun and bloody action sequences. He acknowledges the dialog is poor and the story lame but says the film is "not as bad as you'd suspect" and an adequate, bloody, low-budget vampire film. Steve Chupnick of the Latino Review gave the film a B rating, saying that although it was not a good film, it was far from the worst he's seen and mentioned the Kristanna Loken nude scene as something in the film's favor.

Actor Michael Madsen called BloodRayne "an abomination ... a horrifying and preposterous movie", but added that he enjoyed working with Boll and would certainly work with him again if asked. Laura Bailey, who was the voice of Rayne in the BloodRayne games, was asked at her panel at Anime Boston 2007 what her thoughts were on the film adaptation, and said: "Oh God, that movie sucked. And that movie was so bad. I saw it on The Movie Channel and I couldn't even get through 20 minutes of it! It was so bad and it was kinda sad that they took that because I really liked the games". Guinevere Turner, who wrote the draft screenplay, found the film laughable and suggested that it was the "worst movie ever made" but that it was so camp it might ripen with age.

=== Accolades ===
This film was nominated for six Golden Raspberry Awards, including Worst Picture. However, it did not win any of the awards it was nominated for, having been dominated by Basic Instinct 2 and Little Man. It did, however, win Worst Picture at the Stinkers Bad Movie Awards, as well as Worst Director for Boll, who coincidentally won both categories the previous year for Alone in the Dark.

Date	Award	Category	Recipients	Result	Ref.
2007	Stinkers Bad Movie Awards	Worst Picture	BloodRayne (Romar Entertainment)	Won	
2007	Stinkers Bad Movie Awards	Worst Director	Uwe Boll	Won	
2007	Stinkers Bad Movie Awards	Worst Supporting Actor	Meatloaf Aday	Nominated	
2007	Stinkers Bad Movie Awards	Worst Supporting Actress	Michelle Rodriguez	Nominated	
2007	Stinkers Bad Movie Awards	Worst Screenplay	Guinevere Turner	Nominated	
2007	Stinkers Bad Movie Awards	Worst Ensemble	BloodRayne (Romar Entertainment)	Won	
2007	Stinkers Bad Movie Awards	Most Annoying Fake Accent (Female)	Michelle Rodriguez	Nominated	
2007	Stinkers Bad Movie Awards	Least "Special" Special Effects	BloodRayne (Romar Entertainment)	Won	
2007	Stinkers Bad Movie Awards	Least Scary Horror Film	BloodRayne (Romar Entertainment)	Nominated	
February 24, 2007	Golden Raspberry Awards	Worst Picture	BloodRayne (Romar Entertainment)	Nominated	
February 24, 2007	Golden Raspberry Awards	Worst Actress	Kristanna Loken	Nominated	
February 24, 2007	Golden Raspberry Awards	Worst Supporting Actor	Ben Kingsley	Nominated	
February 24, 2007	Golden Raspberry Awards	Worst Supporting Actress	Michelle Rodriguez	Nominated	
February 24, 2007	Golden Raspberry Awards	Worst Director	Uwe Boll	Nominated	
February 24, 2007	Golden Raspberry Awards	Worst Screenplay	Guinevere Turner	Nominated	

In 2009, Time listed the film #6 on their list of top ten worst video game movies.

The film was number one on GameTrailers countdown of the worst video game movies ever. The reviewers from GameTrailers said that "every actor is miscast, every wig is too fake, every sex scene is too inappropriate, and every action scene is too improvised".

== Sequels ==
A sequel, BloodRayne 2: Deliverance, was released in 2007. Natassia Malthe replaced Loken in the lead role. Due to the poor box office of the first film, BloodRayne 2: Deliverance went direct-to-video instead. A third film, BloodRayne: The Third Reich was released in 2011. Malthe reprised her role as Rayne. Both sequels were directed by Uwe Boll. Michael Paré appeared in all three films, but as different characters: Iancu, Pat Garrett, and Commandant Ekart Brand, respectively.

== Home media ==
Before the DVD of this film was released, Boll removed the Romar name and logo from the credits and packaging of this film. As a result, Romar ceased distributing the film. In addition to the R-rated version which was shown in cinemas, a more violent unrated director's cut including an extended ending was released on DVD. The director's cut DVD box set included a full copy of the BloodRayne 2 video game on the second DVD.

== See also ==
- List of films based on video games
