= BloodRayne 3 =

BloodRayne 3 may refer to:

- BloodRayne: The Third Reich, the third movie in the film series
- BloodRayne: Betrayal, the third video game in the series
