= 27th Golden Raspberry Awards =

Award ceremony presented by the Golden Raspberry Award Foundation in 2006

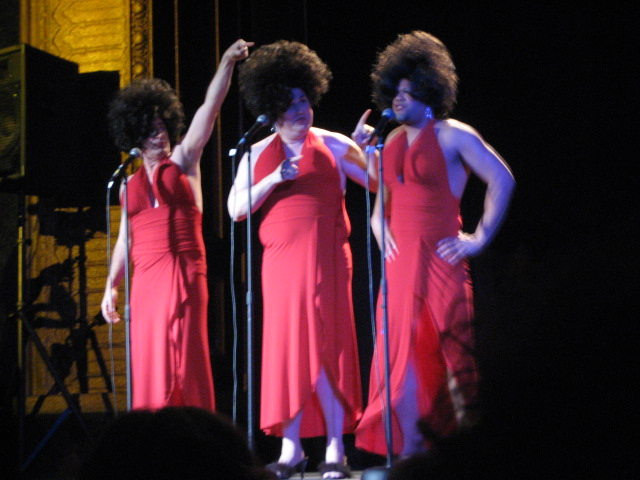
- Dancers performing at the ceremony
- Date: February 24, 2007
- Site: Ivar Theatre, Hollywood, California

Highlights
- Worst Picture: Basic Instinct 2
- Most awards: Basic Instinct 2 (4)
- Most nominations: Basic Instinct 2 / Little Man (7)

The 27th Golden Raspberry Awards, or Razzies, were held at the Ivar Theatre in Hollywood, California on February 24, 2007, to honor the worst films the film industry had to offer in 2006.

The nominations were announced on January 22, 2007. Basic Instinct 2 (which was dubbed by the ceremony as "Basically, It Stinks, Too") and Little Man received the most nominations with seven each.

As has been the tradition, the nominations were announced the day before the Academy Awards nominations, with the award show scheduled one day before to the Academy Awards ceremony.

In recent years, the organizers had added awards that were for a single year only. The Most Tiresome Tabloid Targets category from the previous year was replaced with Worst Excuse for Family Entertainment, which "salutes the death of quality G and PG-rated movie fare in 2006".

The category Worst Remake or Sequel was split into two separate categories: Worst Prequel or Sequel and Worst Remake or Rip-off.

For the first time, the awards program was broadcast over the Internet on MSNBC.com, via cell phone. In an experimental live webcast (referred to as "The Cell-E-Cast"), the show was shot on a series of cell phones and transmitted live by NBC Media Productions.

== Winners and nominees ==
Winner (in bold)

| Category | | Recipient |
|---|---|---|
| Worst Picture | | **Basic Instinct 2 (Sony/MGM)** |
| Worst Picture | | BloodRayne (Romar Entertainment) |
| Worst Picture | | Lady in the Water (Warner Bros.) |
| Worst Picture | | Little Man (Sony/Revolution) |
| Worst Picture | | The Wicker Man (Warner Bros.) |
| Worst Actor | Shawn Wayans | **Marlon and Shawn Wayans in Little Man as Calvin Simms and Darryl Edwards** |
| Worst Actor | Shawn Wayans | Tim Allen in The Santa Clause 3: The Escape Clause, The Shaggy Dog and Zoom as Santa Claus/Scott Calvin, Dave Douglas and Jack Shepard/Captain Zoom (respectively) |
| Worst Actor | Shawn Wayans | Nicolas Cage in The Wicker Man as Edward Malus |
| Worst Actor | Shawn Wayans | Larry the Cable Guy in Larry the Cable Guy: Health Inspector as Larry |
| Worst Actor | Shawn Wayans | Rob Schneider in The Benchwarmers and Little Man as Gus Matthews and D-Rex (respectively) |
| Worst Actress | Sharon Stone | **Sharon Stone in Basic Instinct 2 as Catherine Tramell** |
| Worst Actress | Sharon Stone | Hilary and Haylie Duff in Material Girls as Tanzie and Ava Marchetta |
| Worst Actress | Sharon Stone | Lindsay Lohan in Just My Luck as Ashley Albright |
| Worst Actress | Sharon Stone | Kristanna Loken in BloodRayne as Rayne |
| Worst Actress | Sharon Stone | Jessica Simpson in Employee of the Month as Amy Renfro |
| Worst Supporting Actor | M. Night Shyamalan | **M. Night Shyamalan in Lady in the Water as Vick Ran** |
| Worst Supporting Actor | M. Night Shyamalan | Danny DeVito in Deck the Halls as Buddy Hall |
| Worst Supporting Actor | M. Night Shyamalan | Ben Kingsley in BloodRayne as Kagan |
| Worst Supporting Actor | M. Night Shyamalan | Martin Short in The Santa Clause 3: The Escape Clause as Jack Frost |
| Worst Supporting Actor | M. Night Shyamalan | David Thewlis in Basic Instinct 2 and The Omen as Roy Washburn and Keith Jennings (respectively) |
| Worst Supporting Actress | Carmen Electra | **Carmen Electra in Date Movie and Scary Movie 4 as Anne and Holly (respectively)** |
| Worst Supporting Actress | Carmen Electra | Kate Bosworth in Superman Returns as Lois Lane |
| Worst Supporting Actress | Carmen Electra | Kristin Chenoweth in Deck the Halls, The Pink Panther and RV as Tia Hall, Cherie and Mary Jo Gornicke (respectively) |
| Worst Supporting Actress | Carmen Electra | Jenny McCarthy in John Tucker Must Die as Lori Spencer |
| Worst Supporting Actress | Carmen Electra | Michelle Rodriguez in BloodRayne as Katarin |
| Worst Screen Couple | Kerry Washington | **Shawn Wayans and either Kerry Washington or Marlon Wayans in Little Man** |
| Worst Screen Couple | Kerry Washington | Tim Allen and Martin Short in The Santa Clause 3: The Escape Clause |
| Worst Screen Couple | Kerry Washington | Nicolas Cage and his bear suit in The Wicker Man |
| Worst Screen Couple | Kerry Washington | Hilary and Haylie Duff in Material Girls |
| Worst Screen Couple | Kerry Washington | Sharon Stone's lopsided breasts in Basic Instinct 2 |
| Worst Remake or Rip-off | | **Little Man (Sony/Revolution; rip-off of the 1954 Bugs Bunny cartoon Baby Buggy Bunny)** |
| Worst Remake or Rip-off | | The Pink Panther (Columbia) |
| Worst Remake or Rip-off | | Poseidon (Warner Bros.) |
| Worst Remake or Rip-off | | The Shaggy Dog (Disney) |
| Worst Remake or Rip-off | | The Wicker Man (Warner Bros.) |
| Worst Prequel or Sequel | | **Basic Instinct 2 (Sony/Columbia)** |
| Worst Prequel or Sequel | | Big Momma's House 2 (Fox) |
| Worst Prequel or Sequel | | Garfield: A Tail of Two Kitties (Fox) |
| Worst Prequel or Sequel | | The Santa Clause 3: The Escape Clause (Disney) |
| Worst Prequel or Sequel | | The Texas Chainsaw Massacre: The Beginning (New Line) |
| Worst Director | M. Night Shyamalan | **M. Night Shyamalan for Lady in the Water** |
| Worst Director | M. Night Shyamalan | Uwe Boll for BloodRayne |
| Worst Director | M. Night Shyamalan | Michael Caton-Jones for Basic Instinct 2 |
| Worst Director | M. Night Shyamalan | Ron Howard for The Da Vinci Code |
| Worst Director | M. Night Shyamalan | Keenen Ivory Wayans for Little Man |
| Worst Screenplay | | **Basic Instinct 2, screenplay by Leora Barish and Henry Bean, based on characters created by Joe Eszterhas** |
| Worst Screenplay | | BloodRayne, screenplay by Guinevere Turner, based on the video game |
| Worst Screenplay | | Lady in the Water, written by M. Night Shyamalan |
| Worst Screenplay | | Little Man, written by Keenen Ivory Wayans, Marlon Wayans and Shawn Wayans |
| Worst Screenplay | | The Wicker Man, screenplay adapted by Neil LaBute from a screenplay by Anthony Schaffer |
| Worst Excuse for Family Entertainment | | **RV (Sony/Columbia)** |
| Worst Excuse for Family Entertainment | | Deck the Halls (Fox) |
| Worst Excuse for Family Entertainment | | Garfield: A Tail of Two Kitties (Fox) |
| Worst Excuse for Family Entertainment | | The Santa Clause 3: The Escape Clause (Disney) |
| Worst Excuse for Family Entertainment | | The Shaggy Dog (Disney) |

== Films with multiple nominations ==
These films received multiple nominations:

| Nominations | Films |
|---|---|
| 7 | Basic Instinct 2 |
| 7 | Little Man |
| 6 | BloodRayne |
| 5 | The Santa Clause 3: The Escape Clause |
| 5 | The Wicker Man |
| 4 | Lady in the Water |
| 3 | Deck the Halls |
| 3 | The Shaggy Dog |
| 2 | Garfield: A Tail of Two Kitties |
| 2 | Material Girls |
| 2 | The Pink Panther |
| 2 | RV |

== See also ==
- 2006 in film
- 79th Academy Awards
- 60th British Academy Film Awards
- 64th Golden Globe Awards
- 13th Screen Actors Guild Awards
