= Laura Bailey =

American voice actress (born 1981)

- Bailey at GalaxyCon Des Moines in 2026
- Born: May 28, 1981 (age 45); Mississippi, U.S.
- Other name: Elle Deets (Note: Bailey is credited as Elle Deets in Final Fantasy: Crystal Chronicles: The Crystal Bearers, but she has noted that she voiced the character Belle in her website credits list.)
- Occupation: Voice actress
- Years active: 1999–present
- Spouse: Travis Willingham (m. 2011)
- Children: 1
- Website: laurabaileyvo.com

Laura Bailey (born May 28, 1981) is an American voice actress. She made her debut as Kid Trunks in the Funimation dub of Dragon Ball Z and has since voiced Henrietta in Gunslinger Girl, Emily / Glitter Lucky in Glitter Force, Tohru Honda in Fruits Basket, Lust in Fullmetal Alchemist and Fullmetal Alchemist: Brotherhood, the title character in the Funimation dub of Shin-Chan, and Maka Albarn in Soul Eater. She is a cast member of the web series Critical Role, playing Vex'ahlia ("Vex"), Jester Lavorre, Imogen Temult and Thimble among others.

Bailey's video game voice roles include Rayne in the BloodRayne franchise, Kira Carsen in Star Wars: The Old Republic, Kainé in Nier, Jaina Proudmoore in World of Warcraft, Rise Kujikawa in Persona 4, Kotone Shiomi in Persona 3 Portable, Chun-Li in Street Fighter, Serah Farron in Final Fantasy XIII, the title role in Catherine, Serana in The Elder Scrolls V: Skyrim – Dawnguard, Persephone in the Skylanders series, Oriana Lawson in Mass Effect 3, Lucina in Fire Emblem Awakening, Kushina Uzumaki in Naruto Shippuden: Ultimate Ninja Storm series, Abigail "Fetch" Walker in Infamous Second Son and Infamous First Light, Fiona in Tales from the Borderlands, Nadine Ross in Uncharted 4: A Thief's End and Uncharted: The Lost Legacy, Kait Diaz in the Gears of War franchise, Abby Anderson in The Last of Us Part II, and Invisigal in Dispatch.

Bailey has also voiced Catwoman in Batman: The Telltale Series, Supergirl in Injustice 2, Mary Jane Watson in the Marvel's Spider-Man series, and Black Widow in a number of Marvel projects, particularly the television series Avengers Assemble and the video game Marvel Rivals. Her voice and motion capture role in The Last of Us Part II earned her the BAFTA Award for Best Performer in a Leading Role and the Game Award for Best Performance, as well as a nomination for the D.I.C.E. Award for Outstanding Achievement in Character.

== Early life ==
Bailey was born in Mississippi on May 28, 1981. She is of partial Filipino descent, and has an older sister named Jenny. Her father was in the Air Force, causing the family to move frequently; before she was six years old, they had lived in Oklahoma and Texas, specifically San Antonio and all around North Texas. They eventually settled in Allen, Texas. She had a passing interest in acting and performed in school plays, but was planning to become a biologist. She did not realize she could make a career out of acting until she watched a Dawson's Creek behind-the-scenes special in which Katie Holmes was interviewed. She attended the theatre program at Collin County Community College in Plano, Texas, where she participated in productions of the plays Suburbia, Through a Glass Onion, and Don't Rock the Jukebox.

== Career ==
=== Voice acting ===
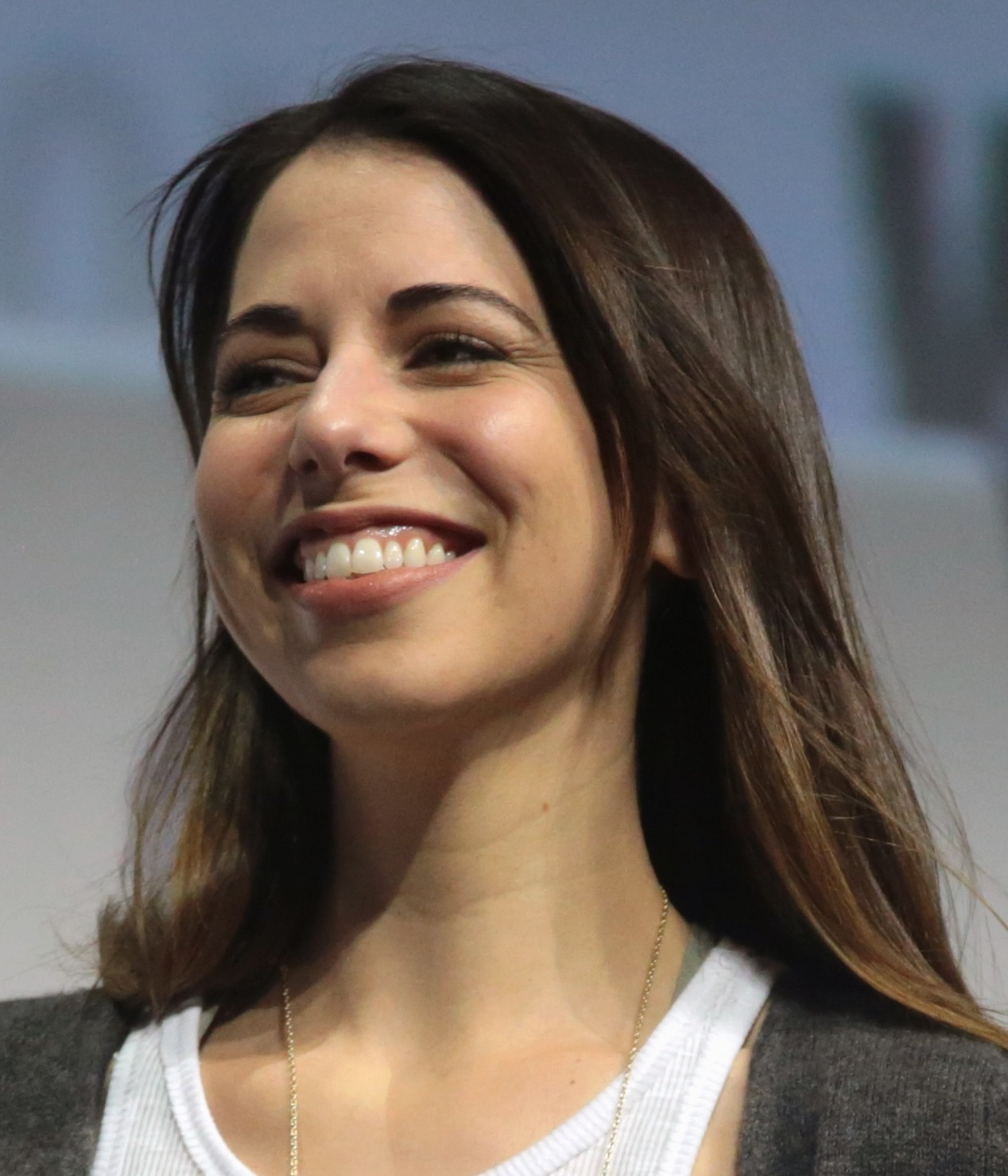
Bailey in April 2017

Voice actor Kent Williams spotted Bailey at one of her college plays and invited her to audition for Funimation while they were working on Dragon Ball Z. Her first major role on Dragon Ball Z was Kid Trunks, which she portrayed with a raspy voice. Bailey initially tried to do the role alongside her college career, but stopped attending on the advice of her lecturer to focus on voice acting. She voiced the starring character Marlene Angel in Blue Gender, which was the first project Funimation did outside of the Dragon Ball world, and Keiko Yukimura in YuYu Hakusho, which ran on Cartoon Network.

Bailey was cast for the starring role of Tohru Honda in the anime Fruits Basket. She said that Tohru's character has helped her be more positive: "I was so inspired by her character by her, joy, and outlook on life that, you know, you wanna emulate that." She later voiced Lust, one of the villains in Fullmetal Alchemist, and Sana Kurata in Kodocha.

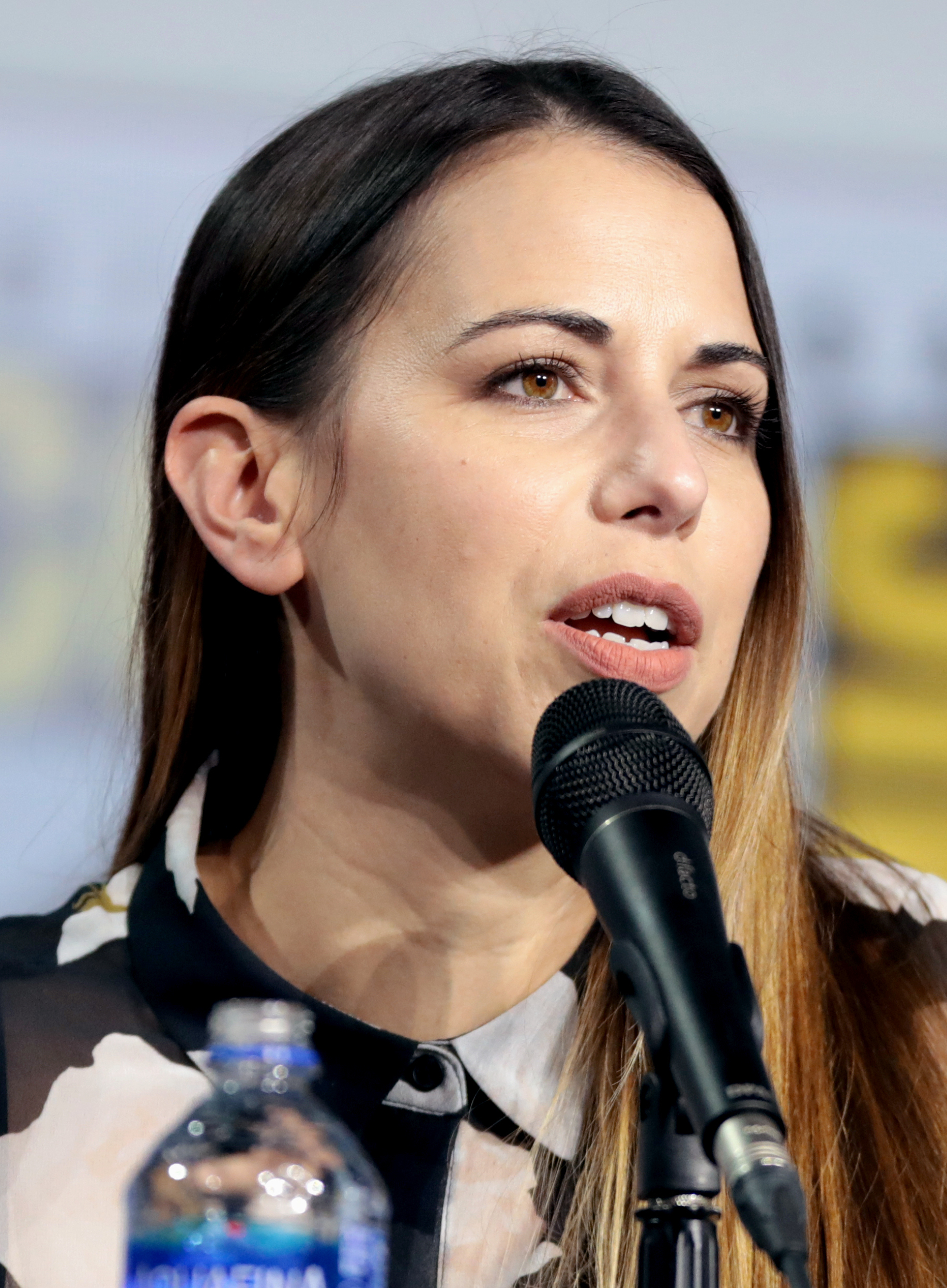
Bailey in July 2019

Bailey had been working with Funimation for about four years before she started ADR directing. She worked on Blue Gender: The Warrior and some episodes of Case Closed. Her first major ADR directing project was Gunslinger Girl, in which she also voices Henrietta. She also co-directed parts of Kodocha. She became a line producer for the Funimation dub of Shin-Chan and also voiced the title character.

Bailey's video game voice roles include Rayne in the BloodRayne franchise, Jaina Proudmoore in World of Warcraft, Rise Kujikawa in Persona 4, the Female Protagonist in Persona 3 Portable, Chun-Li in Street Fighter, Serah Farron in Final Fantasy XIII, Blaze the Cat in Sonic the Hedgehog, the title role in Catherine, Serana in The Elder Scrolls V: Skyrim – Dawnguard, multiple characters in Fallout: New Vegas, Lucina in Fire Emblem Awakening, Abigail "Fetch" Walker in Infamous Second Son and First Light, Fiona in Tales from the Borderlands, Spartan Olympia Vale in Halo 5: Guardians, Nadine Ross in Uncharted 4: A Thief's End and The Lost Legacy, and Kait Diaz in Gears of War.

In 2020, Bailey starred as Abby Anderson in the video game The Last of Us Part II, a role which won her the BAFTA Video Games Award for Best Performer in a Leading Role and the Best Performance award at The Game Awards 2020, despite receiving death threats in response to the game's divisive character choices and plot twists. In 2022, Bailey was nominated for Best VA Performance (EN) at the Crunchyroll Anime Awards.

=== Live-action ===
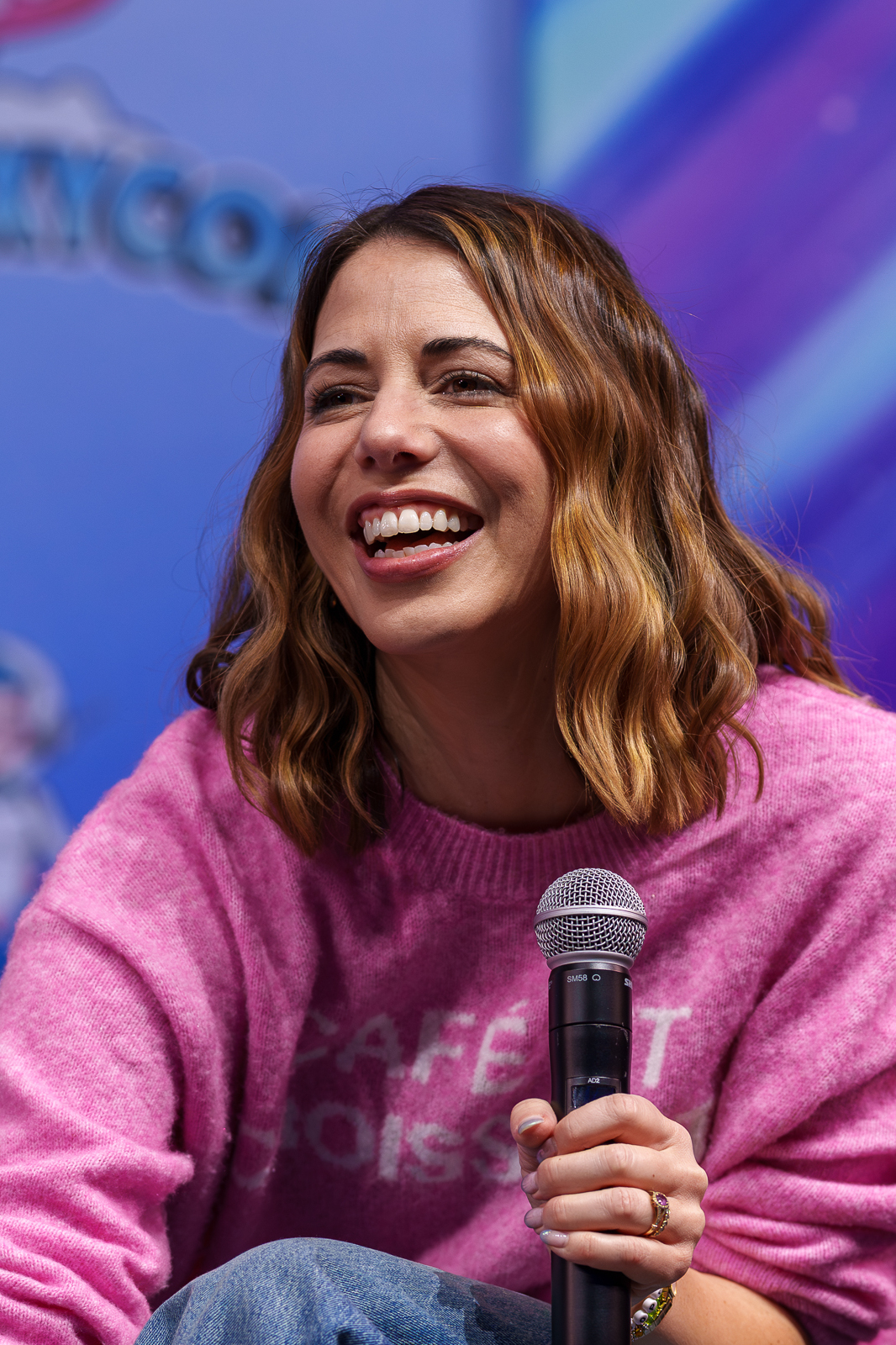
Bailey in December 2025

In 2001, Bailey played a minor role in an episode of Walker, Texas Ranger (titled "Saturday Night") as the daughter of a club owner (Frank Stallone Jr.) with ties to the Mafia. She later had a brief appearance in an episode of One Tree Hill ("It gets worse at night"), which was filmed in Texas. She has appeared in the films Mr. Brooks, Ruffian, and The Staircase Murders.

Bailey is also a cast member of the popular Dungeons & Dragons web series Critical Role, where she played Vex'ahlia ("Vex") in Campaign One, Jester Lavorre in Campaign Two, Imogen Temult in Campaign Three and Thimble in Campaign Four. Critical Role was both the Webby Winner and the People's Voice Winner in the "Games (Video Series & Channels)" category at the 2019 Webby Awards; the show was also both a Finalist and the Audience Honor Winner at the 2019 Shorty Awards. After becoming hugely successful, the Critical Role cast left the Geek & Sundry network in early 2018 and set up their own production company, Critical Role Productions. Soon after, they aimed to raise $750,000 on Kickstarter to create an animated series of their first campaign, but ended up raising over $11 million. In November 2019, Amazon Prime Video announced that they had acquired the streaming rights to this animated series, now titled The Legend of Vox Machina; Bailey reprises her role as Vex. Bailey is also one of the narrators for the audiobook edition of the novel Critical Role: Vox Machina – Kith & Kin (2021).

Bailey made an appearance in the season finale of HBO's live-action adaptation of The Last of Us in a cameo role as a Firefly nurse, a character she voiced in the original game. In September 2026, it was announced that Bailey will return for the third season as Elizabeth.

== Personal life ==
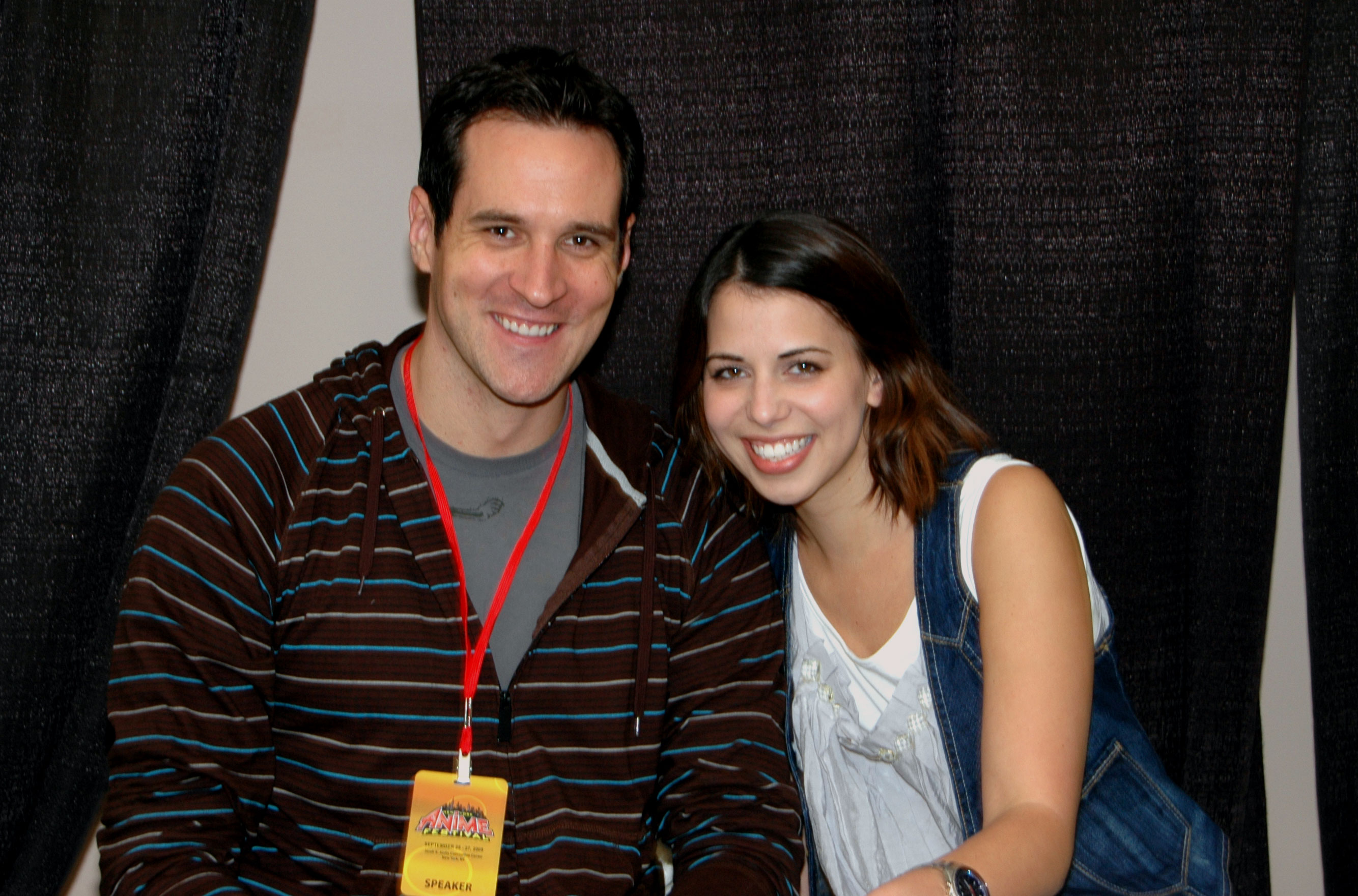
Bailey and Travis Willingham in September 2009

Bailey and fellow voice actress Colleen Clinkenbeard were roommates while working together at Funimation in the late 1990s and early 2000s.

Bailey and voice actor Travis Willingham briefly dated when they were in college. They reconnected years later and were married in Camarillo, California, on September 25, 2011. They reside in Los Angeles with their son.

== Filmography ==
=== Anime ===
List of voice performances in anime
Year	Series	Role	Notes	Source
1999–03	Dragon Ball Z	Young Trunks, Gotenks, Dende, others	Funimation dub Gotenks shared w/ Kara Edwards	
2001–02	Blue Gender	Marlene Angel		
2002–06	Yu Yu Hakusho	Keiko Yukimura	Listed as Kayko	Resume
2002–03	Fruits Basket	Tohru Honda	Also 2019 reboot	
2003	Lupin the 3rd: Dragon of Doom	Kikyo	Television special	
2004	Kiddy Grade	Alv		Resume
2004–10	Case Closed	Serena Sebastian	ADR Director	
2004–06	Fullmetal Alchemist	Lust		Resume
2005	Spiral	Ryoko Takamachi		Resume
2005	Gunslinger Girl	Henrietta	ADR Director	
2005–06	The Galaxy Railways	Layla		Resume
2005–07	Kodocha	Sana Kurata	Line Producer; ADR Director	
2006	Diamond Daydreams	Hanna Jarvinen	Eps. 7–8	Resume
2006–07	Tactics	Rosalie		Resume
2006–07	Negima!?	Evangeline A.K. McDowell, Ayaka Yukihiro	Also Spring and Summer OVAs	Resume
2006–07	Basilisk	Oboro		Resume
2006–07	Tsukuyomi: Moon Phase	Hiromi Anzai		Resume
2006–07	Rumbling Hearts		Line Producer	
2007	SoltyRei	Sylvia Ban		Resume
2007	Beck: Mongolian Chop Squad	Hiromi Masuoka		Resume
2007–09	Tsubasa: Reservoir Chronicle	Xing Huo, Primera		Resume
2007–08	Suzuka	Suzune Asahina		Resume
2007–08	Glass Fleet	Michel Volban de Cabelle / Racine Blanche Volban		Resume
2007–08	One Piece	Conis, others	Funimation dub	Resume
2008	School Rumble	Tsumugi Yuuki		Resume
2008	Genesis of Aquarion	Tsugumi Rosenmeier		Resume
2008	Claymore	Jean		Resume
2008	Ouran High School Host Club	Kanako Kasugazaki	Eps. 2, 13	Resume
2008–09	Naruto	Anko Mitarashi, Toki, others		Resume
2008–09	Code Geass series	Nagisa Chiba, Rakshata Chawla		Resume
2008–09	Darker than Black	Amber		Resume
2008–11	Crayon Shin-Chan	Shinnosuke Nohara	Funimation dub Line Producer; ADR Director	
2008–14	Hellsing Ultimate	Schrödinger		
2009–10	Kurokami: The Animation	Kuro		Resume
2009–14	Bleach	Tier Halibel, Mashiro Kuna, others		Resume
2009	Gunslinger Girl -Il Teatrino-	Henrietta		Resume
2009	Monster	Dieter		Resume
2010	Vampire Knight	Maria Kurenai		
2010	Soul Eater	Maka Albarn		Resume
2010–11	Fullmetal Alchemist: Brotherhood	Lust		Resume
2010–11	Kekkaishi	Tokine Yukimura		Resume
2011–12	K-On! series	Nodoka Manabe	2 TV series	Resume
2011	Marvel Anime: Iron Man	Dr. Chika Tanaka, Children, Aki	Eps. 1, 3–4	
2011	Marvel Anime: X-Men	Mrs. Ichiki, Kyoko, others	Eps. 1–2, 4, 6	
2011–17	Naruto: Shippuden	Kushina Uzumaki, Kurotsuchi, Anko Mitarashi, others		
2012	Street Fighter X Tekken Vita	Chun-Li	Miniseries	Resume
2012	Marvel Anime: Blade	Prostitute, Police Woman	Eps. 2, 4	
2012	Persona 4: The Animation	Rise Kujikawa		
2012–13	Tiger & Bunny	Pao-Lin Huang / Dragon Kid		
2013–15	Digimon Fusion	Lilymon, Beastmon, Shakomon, Mermaimon, others		
2015	Soul Eater Not!	Maka Albarn		
2015–16	Glitter Force	Emily / Glitter Lucky	2 seasons. Saban/Netflix adaptation of Smile PreCure!	
2016	Sengoku Basara: End of Judgement	Oichi		
2017	Dragon Ball Z Kai	Trunks (child)	Replaced by Alexis Tipton in Super	
2019–21	Fruits Basket (2019)	Tohru Honda	2019 reboot	
2019	Ingress: The Animation	ADA, Narrator		
2020	Marvel Future Avengers	Black Widow, Morgan le Fay, Asp		

=== Animation ===
Key
†	Denotes television productions that have not yet been released

List of voice performances in animation
Year	Series	Role	Notes	Source
2011–16	Monster High	Various	Webisodes	
2011	The Super Hero Squad Show	Firestar	2 episode	
2011–13	Winx Club	Princess Tressa, Serena	Nickelodeon dub	Website
2013	Lego Marvel Super Heroes: Maximum Overload	Natasha Romanoff / Black Widow	Television special	
2013–19	Avengers Assemble	Black Widow, Gamora, Darkstar, additional voices		
2014–15	Ultimate Spider-Man	Black Widow	2 episodes	
2014–15	Regular Show	Sheena Albright, Natalia, others		
2015	Batman Unlimited	Cheetah	Web series	
2015	Lego Marvel Super Heroes: Avengers Reassembled	Black Widow	Television special	
2016	RWBY	Amber	Episode: "Beginning of the End"	
2016	The Powerpuff Girls	Princess Bluebelle	Episode: "Once Upon a Townsville"	
2016	Future-Worm!	Various		
2017	Rick and Morty	Eli's Girlfriend	Episode: "Rickmancing the Stone"	
2017	Be Cool, Scooby-Doo!	Stephanie	Episode: "Mysteries on the Disorient Express"	
2017–20	Spider-Man	Gwen Stacy / Spider-Gwen / Ghost-Spider, Black Widow, Crimson Dynamo, various voices		
2018	Constantine: City of Demons	Nightmare Nurse	Web series	
2018	Lego Marvel Super Heroes: Black Panther – Trouble in Wakanda	Black Widow, Reporter	Television film	
2019–20	DuckTales	Various voices	7 episodes	
2019	Lego Marvel Spider-Man: Vexed by Venom	Gwen Stacy / Ghost-Spider	Television film	
2019	Ben 10	Various voices	2 episodes	
2019	Guardians of the Galaxy	Various voices	Episode: "Black Vortex"	
2021	Family Guy	Judge, Dutch Daughter	Episode: "Who's Brian Now?"	
2021	American Dad!	Jennifer, Female Flower Thief, Piper	2 episodes	
2022–present	The Legend of Vox Machina	Vex'ahlia "Vex" Vessar, Elaina, Esreé	Also executive producer	
2023	Lego Marvel Avengers: Code Red	Natasha Romanoff / Black Widow, Little Girl, Sister	Disney+ television special	
2024	Lego Marvel Avengers: Mission Demolition	Natasha Romanoff / Black Widow, Statue of Liberty	Disney+ television special	
2024	Secret Level	Smokes	Episode: "Concord: Tale of the Implacable"	
2025	Lego Marvel Avengers: Strange Tails	Natasha Romanoff / Black Widow	Disney+ television special	
2025–present	The Mighty Nein	Jester Lavorre, others	Executive Producer	

=== Feature films ===
List of voice performances in feature films
Year	Series	Role	Notes	Source
2008	Resident Evil: Degeneration	Angela Miller	Limited theatrical release	
2012	Mass Effect: Paragon Lost	Kamille	Limited theatrical release	
2014	Dragon Ball Z: Battle of Gods	Kid Trunks, Gotenks	Gotenks shared with Kara Edwards limited theatrical release	
2016	Only Yesterday	Nanako Okajima	Limited theatrical release	
2022	Fruits Basket: Prelude	Tohru Honda	Limited theatrical release	

=== Direct-to-video and television films ===
List of voice performances in direct-to-video and television films
Year	Title	Role	Notes	Source
2002–06	Dragon Ball Z films	Trunks (Young), Gotenks, Dende	The Return of Cooler; Broly – Second Coming; Fusion Reborn; Wrath of the Dragon	
2004	Blue Gender: The Warrior	Marlene Angel	ADR Director	
2005	Farewell to Nostradamus	Julia		Resume
2006	A Four Course Meal	Clara, Lisa, Mary		Resume
2006	Origin: Spirits of the Past	Minka		
2006–10	Case Closed films	Serena Sebastian	The Time-Bombed Skyscraper; The Fourteenth Target; The Last Wizard of the Century; Captured in Her Eyes; Countdown to Heaven; The Phantom of Baker Street	
2010	Space Chimps 2: Zartog Strikes Back	Kilowatt, Computer, Girl Reporter, Instar Receptionist		
2011	Tsubasa: Tokyo Revelations	Xing Huo		Resume
2012	The Swan Princess Christmas	Odette	As Elle Deets	
2012	Sengoku Basara: The Last Party	Oichi		
2013	Monster High: Friday Night Frights	Lagoona Blue		
2013	K-On: The Movie	Nodoka Manabe		Resume
2013	Lego Batman: The Movie – DC Super Heroes Unite	Poison Ivy, Wonder Woman, Harley Quinn		
2013	Monster High: 13 Wishes	Headmistress Bloodgood, Lagoona Blue		
2014	JLA Adventures: Trapped in Time	Dawnstar		
2014	The Swan Princess: A Royal Family Tale	Swan Princess Odette	As Elle Deets	
2015	Tiger and Bunny: The Rising	Pao-Lin Huang / Dragon Kid		
2015	Batman Unlimited: Animal Instincts	Cheetah, Newscaster		
2015	Monster High: Boo York, Boo York	Elle Eedee, Headless Headmistress Bloodgood		
2016	Justice League vs. Teen Titans	Angela Chen		
2016	The Swan Princess: Princess Tomorrow, Pirate Today	Swan Princess Odette	As Elle Deets	
2016	Hulk: Where Monsters Dwell	Ana, Kid Dressed as Vampire, Kid Dressed as Football Player		
2017	The Swan Princess: Royally Undercover	Princess Odette		
2021	My Little Pony: A New Generation	Pipsqueak #1, Earth Pony Kid		
2021	Injustice	Lois Lane, Rama Kushna		
2021	Power On: The Story of Xbox	Narrator		
2022	Batman and Superman: Battle of the Super Sons	Lois Lane		
2023	Justice League x RWBY: Super Heroes & Huntsmen, Part Two	Wonder Woman		

=== Video games ===
List of voice performances in video games
Year	Title	Role	Notes	Source
2002	BloodRayne	Rayne		Resume
2003	Deus Ex: Invisible War	Female Alex Denton		Resume
2003	RoadKill	Love Talk No. 1		Resume
2003–16	Dragon Ball series	Trunks (Young), Gotenks, others	Gotenks shared with Kara Edwards	
2004	BloodRayne 2	Rayne		
2005	Spikeout: Battle Street	Min Hua		
2005	Æon Flux	Una, Hostesses		
2008	Klonoa	Hewpoe		
2008	World of Warcraft: Wrath of the Lich King	Jaina Proudmoore, others		Resume
2008	Disgaea 3: Absence of Justice	Raspberyl		
2008	Tales of Vesperia	Gauche		
2008	Infinite Undiscovery	Dominica, Svala, Faina, Leif		
2008	Tales of Symphonia: Dawn of the New World	Marta Lualdi		
2008	Iron Chef America: Supreme Cuisine	Ling Xiu, Reina Vega		
2008	Valkyria Chronicles	Isara Gunther		
2008	Persona 4	Rise Kujikawa		
2009	Ar tonelico II: Melody of Metafalica	Luca Trulyworth		
2009	Star Ocean: The Last Hope	Reimi Saionji, Welch Vineyard		
2009	Street Fighter IV	Chun-Li		
2009	Ghostbusters: The Video Game	Spider Queen, others		Resume
2009	Dissidia: Final Fantasy	Cloud of Darkness		
2009	MagnaCarta 2	Claire		
2009	League of Legends	Akali		Resume
2009	Kamen Rider: Dragon Knight	Siren	As Elle Deets	
2009	Resident Evil: The Darkside Chronicles	Sherry Birkin		
2009	Silent Hill: Shattered Memories	Dahlia Mason	Uncredited (Note: This game did not list any English voice actor credits)	Resume
2009	Final Fantasy Crystal Chronicles: The Crystal Bearers	Belle	As Elle Deets	Resume
2010	Final Fantasy XIII	Serah Farron		
2010	Command & Conquer 4: Tiberian Twilight	E.V.A.		Resume
2010	Sakura Wars: So Long, My Love	Gemini Sunrise		
2010	Nier	Kainé		Resume
2010	Super Street Fighter IV	Chun-Li		
2010	Persona 3 Portable	Female Protagonist		
2010	BlazBlue: Continuum Shift	Platinum		Resume
2010	Valkyria Chronicles II	Isara Gunther		Resume
2010	Quantum Theory	Lainie, Elev		
2010	Sengoku Basara: Samurai Heroes	Oichi		
2010	Arcania: Gothic 4	US Cast		
2010	Naruto Shippuden: Ultimate Ninja Storm 2	Anko Mitarashi, Ayame		
2010	Fallout: New Vegas	Christine Royce, Starlet, Julie Farkas, Doctor Usanagi, Vera Keyes, Carrie Boyd		
2010	Sonic Colors	Blaze the Cat	Nintendo DS version	
2010	Shira Oka: Second Chances	Naoko Ogawa, Suzu Inoue		
2010	Tron: Evolution	The Grid		
2011	Marvel vs. Capcom 3: Fate of Two Worlds	Chun-Li	Also in Ultimate Marvel vs. Capcom 3	Resume
2011	Knights Contract	Gretchen		
2011	Dissidia 012: Final Fantasy	Cloud of Darkness		
2011	The Sims Medieval	Sim		Resume
2011	Hunted: The Demon's Forge	E'lara		
2011	Dungeon Siege III	Various		Resume
2011	Catherine	Catherine		
2011	Resistance 3	Jean Rose, Prisoners		
2011–15	Skylanders games	Persephone, Ninjiini, Mini Jini		
2011	Knights Contract	Gretchen		
2011	Might & Magic Heroes VI	Valeska		Resume
2011	Cabela's Survival: Shadows of Katmai	Dr. Karen West		
2011	Sonic Generations	Blaze the Cat, Omochao		Resume
2011	The Lord of the Rings: War in the North	Andriel		Resume
2011	Saints Row: The Third	The Boss (Female Voice 1)		
2011	Star Wars: The Old Republic	Kira Carsen		
2012	Final Fantasy XIII-2	Serah Farron		
2012	NeverDead	Nikki Summerfield		
2012	Soulcalibur V	Pyrrha	Uncredited	Resume
2012	Kingdoms of Amalur: Reckoning	Gwyn Anwy		
2012	Binary Domain	Faye Lee	Also likeness and motion capture	
2012	MIB: Alien Crisis	Catyana Ibrovsky, Isabel Ramirez, Nethera		
2012	Lego Batman 2: DC Super Heroes	Harley Quinn, Wonder Woman, Poison Ivy		
2012	Street Fighter X Tekken	Chun-Li		
2012	Tales of Graces F	Cheria Barnes		
2012	Armored Core V	Carol Dorry, AC Pilot		
2012	Naruto Shippuden: Ultimate Ninja Storm Generations	Anko Mitarashi, Kurotsuchi		
2012	Kinect Star Wars	NPCFemPadawan, pad4, padFem		
2012	The Elder Scrolls V: Skyrim – Dawnguard	Serana		Resume
2012	World of Warcraft: Mists of Pandaria	Jaina Proudmoore		Resume
2012	Resident Evil 6	Helena Harper		
2012	Wipeout 3	Kate KZ, Trice		
2012	Marvel Avengers: Battle for Earth	Black Widow, Abigail Brand, Jean Grey		
2012	Professor Layton and the Miracle Mask	Angela Ledore	As Elle Deets; Grouped under "Voice Actors"	
2012	Halo 4	Rivera	Also motion capture	
2012	Persona 4 Golden	Rise Kujikawa		Resume
2012	Mass Effect 3	Ensign Rodriguez, Dr. Eva Coré, Oriana Lawson, Lt. Kurin		Resume
2013	Fire Emblem Awakening	Lucina		
2013	Naruto Shippuden: Ultimate Ninja Storm 3	Kushina Uzumaki, Kurotsuchi		
2013	Gears of War: Judgment	Alex Brand		
2013	BioShock Infinite	Lady Comstock		
2013	Lost Echo	Hera		
2013	The Last of Us	News Reporter, various		Resume
2013	Saints Row IV	The President (Female Voice 1)		
2013	Lost Planet 3	Mira		Resume
2013	The Wonderful 101	Alice MacGregor		
2013	Rune Factory 4	Dolce	Also Special	
2013	Wipeout: Create & Crash	Kate KZ, Steven Swashbuckle, Annie the Conqueror, Deep-Sea Danny		
2013	Lego Marvel Super Heroes	Black Widow, Jean Grey, Mystique		Resume
2013	Batman: Arkham Origins	Voiceover Talent		
2013	Knack	Charlotte		
2014	Dragon Ball Z: Battle of Z	Gotenks, Kid Trunks		
2014	Lightning Returns: Final Fantasy XIII	Serah Farron		
2014	Captain America: The Winter Soldier – The Official Game	Black Widow		
2014	Infamous Second Son	Abigail "Fetch" Walker	Also motion capture and likeness	
2014	WildStar	Belle Walker, Marauder, Luminai Female, Mordesh Female		
2014	The Wolf Among Us	Rachel, Aunty Greenleaf		
2014	Diablo III: Reaper of Souls	Demon Hunter (Female)		
2014	Infamous First Light	Abigail "Fetch" Walker	Also motion capture Nominated–D.I.C.E. Award for Outstanding Achievement in Character	
2014	Spider-Man Unlimited	Spider-Woman		
2014	Naruto Shippuden: Ultimate Ninja Storm Revolution	Kushina Uzumaki, Kurotsuchi, Anko Mitarashi		
2014	Disney Infinity: Marvel Super Heroes	Black Widow, Sif	Grouped under "Voice Talent"; Starting with version 2.0	
2014	Middle-earth: Shadow of Mordor	Ioreth		
2014	Lego Batman 3: Beyond Gotham	Wonder Woman, Catwoman		
2014	World of Warcraft: Warlords of Draenor	Voice Over Cast		
2014	Dragon Age Inquisition	Bianca Davri, Dagna		
2014	Sunset Overdrive	Wendy Tarth, Calista		
2014	Tales from the Borderlands	Fiona		
2014–15	Super Smash Bros. for Nintendo 3DS and Wii U	Lucina		
2015	Game of Thrones	Gwyn Whitehill	Episode: "The Lost Lords"	
2015	Code Name: S.T.E.A.M.	Lucina		
2015	Saints Row: Gat out of Hell	President		
2015	Infinite Crisis	Mecha Wonder Woman		
2015	Heroes of the Storm	Jaina Proudmoore, Valla	World of Warcraft crossover	
2015	Batman: Arkham Knight	Voiceover and Mocap Talent		
2015	Disney Infinity 3.0	Voice Talent		
2015	Mad Max	Talent		
2015	Metal Gear Solid V: The Phantom Pain	Soldiers, Extras		
2015–16	Lego Dimensions	Wonder Woman, Dorothy Gale, Maggie Sawyer, Omochao	Grouped under "Voiceover Talent"	
2015	Halo 5: Guardians	Olympia Vale	Also motion capture and likeness	
2016	Naruto Shippuden: Ultimate Ninja Storm 4	Kushina Uzumaki, Kurotsuchi, Sarada Uchiha	with Road to Boruto	
2016	Street Fighter V	Chun-Li		
2016	Uncharted 4: A Thief's End	Nadine Ross	Also motion capture	
2016	Batman: The Telltale Series	Selina Kyle / Catwoman	Won–BTVA Award for Best Female Lead; Vocal Performance in a Video Game	
2016	Gears of War 4	Kait Diaz		
2017	Injustice 2	Supergirl		
2017	Farpoint	Eva Tyson		
2017	Uncharted: The Lost Legacy	Nadine Ross	voice and motion capture Nominated–BAFTA Award for Best Performer	
2017	Marvel vs. Capcom: Infinite	Black Widow		
2017	Middle-earth: Shadow of War	Eltariel		
2017–18	Batman: The Enemy Within	Selina Kyle / Catwoman, others		
2018	Dissidia Final Fantasy NT	Cloud of Darkness		
2018	Pillars of Eternity II: Deadfire	Xoti, Vex'ahlia		
2018	World of Warcraft: Battle for Azeroth	Jaina Proudmoore	Credited as "Voice Over Cast"	
2018	Marvel's Spider-Man	Mary Jane Watson	voice and motion Capture	
2018	World of Final Fantasy Maxima	Serah Farron		
2018	Super Smash Bros. Ultimate	Lucina	Archive audio, uncredited	
2019	Days Gone	Lisa Jackson		
2019	Marvel Ultimate Alliance 3: The Black Order	Black Widow, Danger Room		
2019	Catherine: Full Body	Catherine		
2019	Gears 5	Kait Diaz	Also motion capture Nominated–The Game Awards for Best Performance	
2020	Dota 2	Wei (a.k.a. The Disciple's Path)		
2020	The Last of Us Part II	Abby	Also motion capture The Game Awards for Best Performance; British Academy Games Award for Performer; Nominated–D.I.C.E. Award for Outstanding Achievement in Character	
2020–23	Marvel's Avengers	Black Widow		
2020	World of Warcraft: Shadowlands	Jaina Proudmoore		
2020	The Pathless	Hunter		
2020–21	Jurassic World Aftermath	Dr. Amelia "Mia" Everett		
2021	Nier: Replicant ver.1.22474487139..	Kainé		
2021–22	Teppen	Oichi, Sengoku Machine Armor		
2021	BloodRayne Betrayal: Fresh Bites	Rayne		
2021	Call of Duty: Vanguard	Lt. Polina Petrova	BAFTA Games Award nominee for Best Performer in a Supporting Role Also motion capture performance	
2021	Ruined King: A League of Legends Story	Miss Fortune		
2022	New Tales from the Borderlands	Fiona		
2022	Marvel's Midnight Suns	Illyana Rasputina / Magik		
2022	The Elder Scrolls Online – High Isle	Isobel Veloise		
2023	Stray Gods: The Roleplaying Musical	Grace		
2023	Marvel's Spider-Man 2	Mary Jane Watson / Scream	voice and motion capture	
2024	Marvel Rivals	Black Widow		
2025	Date Everything!	Harper		
2025	Dead Take	Zara Good		
2025	Dispatch	Invisigal / Courtney	Nominated–D.I.C.E. Award for Outstanding Achievement in Character	

=== Audio books ===
List of voice performances in audio books
Year	Title	Role	Notes	Source
2021	Critical Role: Vox Machina – Kith & Kin	Vex'ahlia "Vex" Vessar		
2022	Critical Role: The Mighty Nein – The Nine Eyes of Lucien	Jester Lavorre		
2024	Critical Role: Bells Hells – What Doesn't Break	Imogen Temult		
2025	Critical Role: Vox Machina – Stories Untold	Narrator		
2026	Critical Role: Mighty Nein – Stories Untold	Narrator		

=== Live-action ===
List of acting performances in film and television
Year	Title	Role	Notes	Source
2001	Walker, Texas Ranger	Roberta	Episode: "Saturday Night"	Resume
2003	Graduation Day	Marni		
2007	Four Sheets to the Wind	Francie		Resume
2007	Mr. Brooks	Flight Attendant		Resume
2007	Thief		1 episode (Note: Bailey was credited for an episode of Thief but her scene was cut from the broadcast.)	Resume
2007	The Staircase Murders	Margaret Peterson	Television film	
2007	Ruffian	Cassie	Television film	Resume
2007	One Tree Hill	Girl No. 2	Episode: "It Gets Worse at Night"	Resume
2007	Underbelly	Sara Hotchkiss		Resume
2015	To Have and to Hold	Jane Pierce		Resume
2023, 2027	The Last of Us	Nurse	Episode: "Look for the Light"	
2023, 2027	The Last of Us	Elizabeth	Guest (season 3)	

=== Web ===
List of acting performances in web series
Year	Title	Role	Notes	Source
2015–present	Critical Role	Vex'ahlia de Rolo, née Vessar (campaign 1)	Cast member Creator-owned actual play Dungeons & Dragons web series	
2015–present	Critical Role	Jester Lavorre (campaign 2)	Cast member Creator-owned actual play Dungeons & Dragons web series	
2015–present	Critical Role	Imogen Temult, Emhira (campaign 3)	Cast member Creator-owned actual play Dungeons & Dragons web series	
2015–present	Critical Role	Thimble (campaign 4)	Cast member Creator-owned actual play Dungeons & Dragons web series	
2015	Titansgrave: The Ashes of Valkana	Lemley	Cast member Actual play web series	
2017	Escape the Night	Narrator	Season 2 (10 episodes)	
2023	Candela Obscura	Arlo Black	3 episodes Actual play Illuminated Worlds web series	
2025	Age of Umbra	Adelia Pruitt	Actual play limited series using the Daggerheart system	
2026	Age of Umbra: Sallowlands	Sister	Actual play limited series using the Daggerheart system	
