= Johari Window (Fringe) =

- Fringe episode
- Astrid comforts Teddy Falls (Liam James)
- Episode no.: Season 2 Episode 12
- Directed by: Joe Chappelle
- Written by: Josh Singer
- Production code: 3X5111
- Original air date: January 14, 2010

Guest appearances
- Liam James as Teddy Falls; Laura Mennell as Rose Falls; Martin Cummings as Joseph Falls; Michael O'Neill as Sheriff Paul Velchik; Kwesi Ameyaw as Agent Frug

Episode chronology
← Previous "Unearthed"	Next → "What Lies Below"
- Fringe season 2

"Johari Window" is the 11th episode of the second season of the American television series Fringe. It was released three days after the bonus special episode, "Unearthed". The episode, written by co-executive producer Josh Singer and directed by filmmaker Joe Chappelle, is set in a fictional upstate New York town and begins with the discovery of a seemingly deformed child by a state trooper. The Fringe investigative team of Olivia Dunham, Walter Bishop, and Peter Bishop arrives on the scene, only to discover a secret government experiment gone awry, with signs from Walter's past.

Originally called "Edina City Limits", the episode's title was changed shortly before it aired. It premiered in the United States on January 14, 2010, on Fox, to 6.529 million viewers and a 2.6 share 18–49. The episode received average reviews, as many critics compared it either negatively or positively to a B-movie, though most agreed that it seemed to be rehashed from older The X-Files episodes. Several of the main actors, however, thoroughly enjoyed the episode; Noble named it one of his favorite Fringe episodes. Critics also noted the popular culture references to The Wizard of Oz (1939), Deliverance (1972), and Joseph Merrick.

== Plot ==
In upstate New York, a child is picked up on the road by a state trooper. While en route, the child suddenly morphs into a deformed creature. At the station, the troopers try to decide what to do with him, and one takes his picture. Two other deformed people enter the station, kill the troopers and take the boy.

The Fringe team comes on the scene to investigate and find the boy's photograph, along with recorded sightings of deformed people going back 30 years. They arrive in Edina, the city these sightings occurred near, and Olivia Dunham (Anna Torv) hears a buzz called the "Edina hum". The sheriff explains it is coming from a nearby military base and offers to show them case files of past sightings. While driving, the SUV containing Olivia, Peter (Joshua Jackson), and Walter (John Noble) is run off the road by another vehicle, whose driver then starts shooting at them before getting shot and leaving. The FBI find the abandoned vehicle and follow a blood trail to the shooter. Peter is visibly disturbed after killing his first person, and Olivia tries to comfort him.

Agent Broyles discovers that the army did classified experiments in Edina called "Project Elephant", but most of the records are gone. The team brings the body, along with a butterfly Walter found in the town and thought Astrid would like, back to the lab in Boston. They discover that both have transformed into deformed versions of themselves. Peter and Olivia go back to Edina to talk with the sheriff and try to locate the owner of the truck. Meanwhile, back in the lab, Walter tries to remember why the case feels so familiar. Throughout the episode Walter had been humming the Toreador Song, and he and Astrid realize he might previously have worked on the project with the army. The melody was a memory trick Walter used to remind himself where he stored the experiment files so many years ago. The experiment was done by the army in the late 1970s to test how electromagnetic pulses can camouflage soldiers and was conducted on the townspeople; the army was unaware of the long-term effects of the study until it was too late, and the people were stuck in a deformed state. The "hum" hides their deformities from the human eye through a massive electromagnetic pulse that runs through the town, and once they leave and are out of the pulse's reach, their true deformities show.

Walter and Astrid find the source of the electromagnetic pulse, and begin investigating the house the pulse was built on. At the same time, Peter and Olivia go to a rural meeting place where the sheriff said they would find the truck's owner, only to be shot at by the sheriff and his deputy, who are hell-bent on keeping the town's secret. Walter manages to turn off the pulse, and all of the townsfolk revert to their deformed appearance. The daughter of one of the army scientists saves Olivia and Peter from getting shot, and explains that her father stayed in Edina to perfect the pulse. After Walter pleads to Broyles to let the townspeople keep their secret, the Fringe team decides to not report the case so that the remaining residents can live a normal life.

== Production ==
"[Johari Window] involve[s] the Fringe team members being personally affected by what's happening. I always love those episodes when it's not just the team going and trying to save all these people, they're trying to save each other or themselves".

— Actress Jasika Nicole

The episode was the second written by co-executive producer and writer Josh Singer, and was the third directed by co-executive producer Joe Chappelle. It was originally titled "Edina City Limits" in press and promotional items, until Fox changed it to "Johari Window" without explanation on January 5, a week before it broadcast. A johari window is a cognitive psychological tool used to help people better understand their interpersonal communication and relationships, and may have been chosen as the episode's title because it corresponded to the transformative nature of the plot.

The sound mixing department's inspiration for the "Edina hum" (the frequency hiding the deformities of the townsfolk) came from executive producer Jeff Pinkner. Supervising sound editor Paul Curtis later recalled Pinkner's asking for it to sound like "100-year locusts back east", consequently what the crew "basically...ended up with were bugs". They also layered in a variety of machine sounds. Sound effects editor Bruce Tanis remarked that because the background sound lasted the entire episode, it had to be handled "thoughtfully".

"What's weird about the Edina hum is that you hear it all over the town. It goes to the borders of this little town: indoors, outdoors, down the street, in the basement; you hear some level of it, but you don't want to hear that for 44 minutes of a show. It'll drive you nuts. So you have to blend it in, pick moments, bring it up, take it down, so that people can reference it, but you're not listening to 44 minutes of hum".

— Bruce Tanis

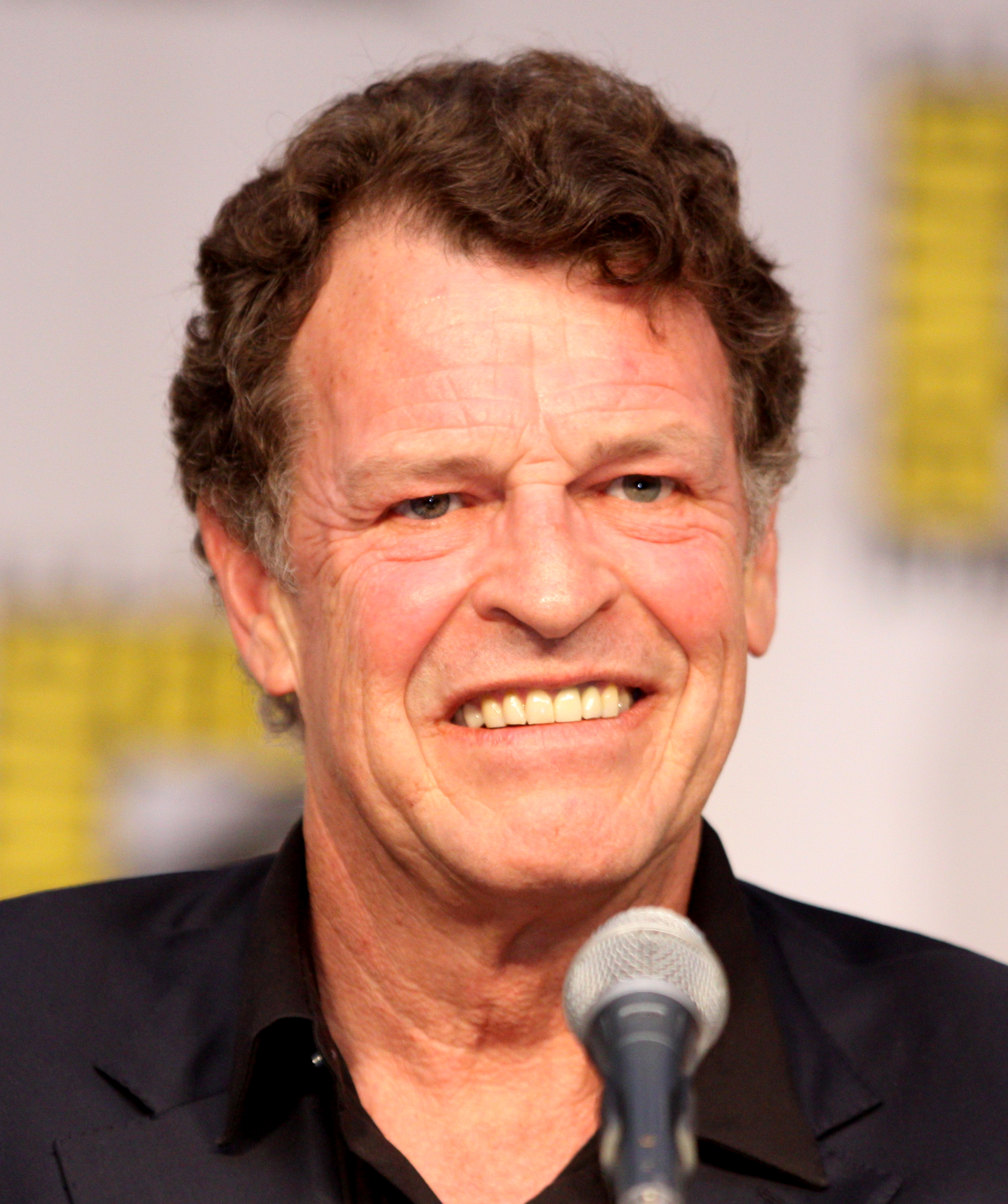
John Noble later remarked "Johari Window" was one of his favorite episodes.

Actor Joshua Jackson later remarked that "Johari Window" was a "stand-alone" episode in an interview: "There is nothing from that thing that broadens the story, except at the heart of it, is a story about love and acceptance and family... Which of course, for these two guys, is the entire theme of the show for them. So I think we've done that really well". Actor John Noble added, "Tolerance. Acceptance. I loved 'Johari Window'. I thought it was one of my favourite stories".

== Cultural references ==
When Walter refuses to get out of the car to enter a supermarket, he mentions he is "learning to appreciate cowardice" and that "the lion had a point", a reference, he explains to Peter, about the cowardly lion from The Wizard of Oz (1939). Walter also mentions flying monkeys and talking lions later in the episode, both also homages to the movie. Later, Walter excitedly says he remembers someone who played the banjo and looked like the kidnapped, deformed boy, and starts humming a tune. Peter completes the tune and explains it is from the movie Deliverance (1972), which depicts murderous, inbred, and deformed people living in rural Georgia. The army experiment was titled "Project Elephant", a possible reference to Joseph Merrick, a deformed person known as the "Elephant Man". When Walter shows Astrid how the moth changes back to the butterfly when they enter the town, he says "a friend once said 'any sufficiently advanced technology is indistinguishable from magic.'" This was originally said by Arthur C. Clarke, originally appearing in Clarke's 1973 revision of "Hazards of Prophecy: The Failure of Imagination".

== Reception ==
=== Ratings ===
"Johari Window" was watched by more than 6.529 million viewers, achieving a 2.6 share of viewers aged 18–49. It rose thirteen percent from the previous week's episode, and was the highest rated night of Fringe since the season premiere.

=== Reviews ===
Ramsey Isler of IGN thought there was not much original or well-done about the episode, and negatively compared it to previous episodes of The X-Files. He wrote the "slow...story [lacked] the intrigue and excitement that other episodes in the series had," but praised its conclusion as a "pay off". John McCracken of TV Guide also compared it to The X-Files, and thought the episode was "tedious" and "largely felt like a by-the-numbers B-movie affair". Jane Boursaw of TV Squad enjoyed the "B-movie" aspects of the plot however, calling them "fun". She thought the episode felt like "a thriller movie," and praised Noble's acting as "brilliantly". Noel Murray of The A.V. Club gave the episode a C, explaining that "despite some good makeup effects and a few emotional moments, "Johari Window" [was] distressingly average". Andrew Hanson of the Los Angeles Times enjoyed how the "Edina hum" remained in the background of every town scene, but missed the "investigation exposition"-supplying presence of Charlie Francis (Kirk Acevedo). Television Without Pity graded the episode a B−.
