= What Lies Below (Fringe) =

- Fringe episode
- Walter and Broyles block an infected man from escaping the building
- Episode no.: Season 2 Episode 13
- Directed by: Deran Sarafian
- Written by: Jeff Vlaming
- Production code: 3X5112
- Original air date: January 21, 2010

Guest appearances
- Geoff Pierson as Arnold McFadden; Demore Barnes as Agent Bill Hubert; Conrad Coates as Vincent Ames; Natassia Malthe as Linda; David Richmond-Peck as CSI Detective Kassel; Brendan Beiser as Steve; Nicolas Von Zill as Radjan Vandenkemp

Episode chronology
← Previous "Johari Window"	Next → "The Bishop Revival"
- Fringe season 2

"What Lies Below" is the 12th episode of the second season of the American science fiction drama television series Fringe. Set in a quarantined Boston office building, the episode revolves around a thousands-year-old viral hemorrhagic fever that infects and then influences its victims to attempt to spread the viral particles outside of the building.

It was the third Fringe episode to be written by supervising producer Jeff Vlaming, while it was director Deran Sarafian's only credit for the series to date. After his character becomes infected, actor Joshua Jackson commented during shooting to "just imagine the worst hangover I've ever had and multiply it by ten".

"What Lies Below" first aired in the United States on January 21, 2010, on the Fox network. An estimated 6.90 million viewers watched the episode, and it received mixed reviews from critics, with one calling it average and predictable.

== Plot ==
In Boston, a visibly sick man from the Netherlands arrives at an office building, only to collapse and die. The veins in his body erupt with blood, spraying surrounding witnesses. The Fringe team arrive on site, and while interviewing the witnesses, another man also becomes sick. The sick man attempts to leave the building, only to be stopped by Walter (John Noble), who sees the man spray out blood and realizes there is a contagion. The building is quarantined with Walter's son Peter (Joshua Jackson), FBI agent Olivia (Anna Torv), and the rest of the witnesses still inside.

The CDC arrives and soon clash with Walter, who wants some blood samples to take back to his lab at Harvard. As another witness, the receptionist, falls ill, the rest begin panicking that the virus is an airborne contagion. Olivia discovers that the Dutch man was an oil consultant who arrived to meet with Mr. Ames, one of the other office workers trapped in the building.

Walter explains that viruses have forms of "personalities," that influence their hosts to act in certain ways. He posits that the virus is not airborne after all, but needs more samples for further tests. Meanwhile, the infected receptionist is influenced by the virus, jumps out a window, and also scares Peter into falling into an infected pool of blood. The woman is sprayed with disinfectant spray, as Peter quickly rinses himself off. Knowing he is likely infected, Peter searches through the Dutch man's pockets, leading to the discovery of a briefcase infected by the virus.

Walter continues his theory that the virus wants to escape the building, hence the multiple escape attempts by the infected. The virus was found on a sample taken 10 miles below the earth, and may be 75,000 years old and responsible for wiping out the Ice Age mammals. As a bio-hazard team enters the building to test people for the virus, a CDC official orders the army to prepare for a "level six eradication", because they still do not know how to contain it.

Peter manages to fake the test and hide his infection. He and Olivia begin leading a team of healthy people outside the building, but before Peter is able to leave, his nose bleeds, clearly revealing that he is infected. While the virus overtakes Peter's health and sanity, Walter becomes increasingly distressed as he fears losing his son again, and accidentally blurts out that he "can't let Peter die again" to Astrid (Jasika Nicole). Despite the threat of eradication and death, he and Astrid remain in the building to run further tests on the Dutch man. Walter realizes that sulfuric ash killed the virus thousands of years ago, and successfully finds a cure with some horseradish he found in the office break room.

The CDC agrees to allow Olivia to enter the building and use the air ventilation system to spread some fentanyl gas, which will gain them time while the cure is synthesized. While inside, Peter attacks her, but Olivia is able to turn the air on, successfully knocking out the building's occupants. Peter and everyone else are successfully cured. Astrid later approaches Walter and asks what he meant when he said he couldn't let Peter die again, to which he responds by saying "some things are meant to be left alone."

== Production ==
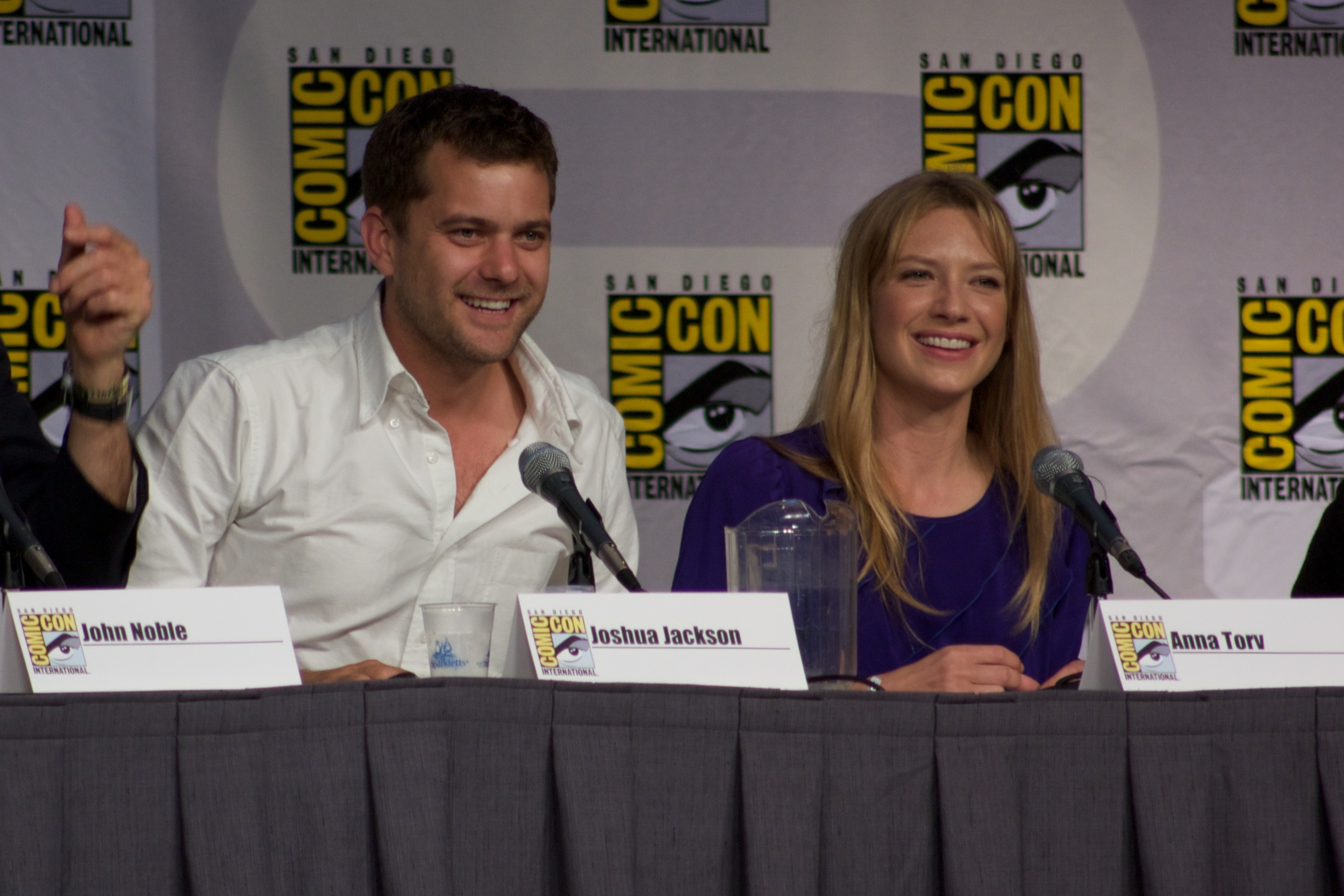
Peter Bishop, played by actor Joshua Jackson (pictured left), becomes infected with an ancient virus in the episode.

Supervising producer Jeff Vlaming wrote "What Lies Below", his second episode of the season. Filmmaker Deran Sarafian served as the director, his first and only Fringe directional credit. The episode featured one-time guest appearances by actors Demore Barnes, Geoff Pierson, Conrad Coates, Natassia Malthe, and David Richmond-Peck. Actor Joshua Jackson, who plays an infected Peter Bishop in the episode, noted during shooting that he found inspiration from "imagin[ing] the worst hangover I've ever had and multiply it by ten".

Actress Jasika Nicole was pleased that the writers decided to let her character discover Walter's secret, commenting "Astrid finds out in a really emotional way because Walter lets it slip to her accidentally. I think that it was really nice for them to invite Astrid into the importance of that instead of keeping her in the dark. At least she knows that she's a part of this family and this affects her. I think she serves as a really important character in these later episodes because Astrid is kind of the only person that isn't directly involved with everything that is still on his side. She has to step up to the plate and be that comfort for him because if he doesn't have anyone there, he's basically going to regress and go back to the place, I think mentally, that he was in when he was in the mental institution. And of course we don't want that."

One of the episode's scenes involves an infected woman jumping out of the building onto a van in an attempt to spread the virus further. To simulate her 160-feet fall, stuntwoman Angela Uyeda was placed in a crane 10 to 15 feet above the van and asked to jump onto the van below. The crew removed the roof structure on the van, and carefully rigged it to cave in upon impact but also make it as painless as possible for Uyeda. To achieve this, they modified the ribs that supported the roof by placing them on pins that would snap, and also added a three-millimeter glass plate that would snap between two sheets of black hard nylon-type plastic to further emphasize the distance she jumped.

== Reception ==
=== Ratings ===
The first airing of "What Lies Below" was watched by an estimated 6.90 million viewers in the United States, with a 2.6/7 rating for those aged 18–49. SFScope writer Sarah Stegall considered these numbers to be "steady but stagnant ratings", as they were "not much different" from the previous week.

=== Reviews ===
"What Lies Below" received mixed reviews from television critics. The A.V. Club contributor Emily VanDerWerff graded the episode with a B−, explaining that despite some nice moments, it was "an episode of the show that started out utterly predictably, continued along an utterly predictable path and yet somehow got fairly enjoyable by the end just through sheer force of will on the part of the cast." IGN's Ramsey Isler also found the episode average and predictable, as it lacked "much of the quintessential storytelling elements that, once upon a time, made this one of the best shows on TV." Like many other critics, Isler thought the episode was too similar to The X-Files, and gave it 7.0/10. TV Squad columnist Jane Boursaw thought Walter discovering a cure was a little far-fetched, and wished Broyles was a greater part of the show. Television Without Pity gave the episode a B+.

Andrew Hanson from the Los Angeles Times thought it was a really good episode, and even wished it could have been turned into a movie, were Fringe to get into filmmaking. Josh Wigler of MTV thought it was a "pretty cool" mystery-of-the-week, and "while not quite as strong as when the mythology is in full gear, 'What Lies Below' was nonetheless a compelling hour of television." He was however bothered that there was no further information about the parallel universe. UGO Networks writer Alex Zalben compared "What Lies Below" to the similarly plotted The X-Files episode "Ice". Zalben concluded, "Though both episodes are very good, 'Ice' is one of the best X-Files hours ever, perfectly channeling – but not ripping off – John Carpenter's The Thing."

=== Awards and nominations ===
Director Deran Sarafian submitted "What Lies Below" for consideration in the Outstanding Directing for a Drama Series category at the 62nd Primetime Emmy Awards. He did not receive a nomination.
