= BloodRayne: The Third Reich =

2011 film by Uwe Boll

- Directed by: Uwe Boll
- Written by: Michael Nachoff
- Based on: BloodRayne series by Terminal Reality
- Produced by: Uwe Boll; Dan Clarke; Wolfgang Herold
- Starring: Natassia Malthe; Michael Paré; Willam Belli
- Cinematography: Mathias Neumann
- Edited by: Karen Porter
- Music by: Jessica de Rooij
- Production companies: Boll Kino Beteiligungs GmbH & Co. KG; Herald Productions
- Distributed by: Phase 4 Films
- Release dates: May 2, 2011 (United Kingdom); June 24, 2011 (Germany); July 5, 2011 (United States)
- Running time: 79 minutes
- Countries: United States; Canada; Germany
- Language: English
- Budget: $10 million

BloodRayne: The Third Reich is a 2011 direct-to-DVD vampire action film written by Michael Nachoff and directed by Uwe Boll, and starring Natassia Malthe as dhamphir Agent Rayne and Michael Paré as vampire Nazi officer Ekart Brand.

Set in Yugoslavia 1943, during World War II, it is the third and final installment of the BloodRayne film trilogy, based on the video game series of the same name. It is a sequel to BloodRayne and BloodRayne 2: Deliverance, also directed by Boll. This is the second BloodRayne film to star Malthe after BloodRayne 2: Deliverance. Paré, who played Iancu in BloodRayne and Pat Garrett in BloodRayne 2: Deliverance, plays yet another character in this film.

BloodRayne: The Third Reich was first released in the UK on May 2, 2011, before being released in Germany on June 24 and in the US eleven days later. Like its predecessors, it received negative reviews from critics.

== Plot ==
Agent Rayne fights against the Nazis in Yugoslavia during World War II with a resistance group, encountering Commander Ekart Brand, a German officer whose goal is to inject Adolf Hitler with Rayne's blood in an attempt to transform him into an all-powerful dhampir and attain immortality.

The film opens with train cars full of humans heading to concentration camps when a resistance group intercepts them. Soon, Rayne arrives and kills most of the Nazi troops and corners Commander Brand in a train car. As the two talk, one of his men shoots Rayne, splashing her blood on the Brand's face. Rayne kills the soldier before impaling Brand on a pole and leaving him to die. Rayne soon converses with the leader of the resistance, Nathaniel Gregor, who is aware that Rayne is a dhampir. After finding the train cars full of prisoners, the resistance and Rayne decide to work together to fight the Nazis. After they leave, however, Brand is revealed to have survived his presumed death due to some of Rayne's blood getting in his mouth, implying that he is now a dhampir.

At a concentration camp, a scientist named Dr. Wolfgang Mangler is torturing vampires to study them so he can make Adolf Hitler and the Third Reich immortal. Oberleutnant Kaspar Jaeger informs the doctor that the commander was attacked by a "vampire" in the daytime, piquing his interest.

Elsewhere, Rayne heads to a brothel to get a massage when she overhears a soldier beating on one of the women. Angered by the beating interrupting her massage, Rayne easily beats the man down, forcing the brothel owner to close early, despite being warned that the Nazis would suspect something is wrong. She ignores the warning and angrily tells Rayne that she better not be a problem for her business. Rayne scoffs at the woman before walking off. As Rayne prepares to leave, a voluptuous woman stops Rayne and thanks her for saving the woman from before, taking off Rayne's robe. Another woman lights several candles as the woman continues to hit on Rayne. The woman walks out, telling Rayne and the busty woman to "have fun." Initially refusing her advances at first, the woman finally manages to seduce Rayne and has sex with her. As the woman sexually dominates Rayne, one of the women listens to their intercourse, smiling mischievously before walking out of the brothel. Rayne continues to have sex with the woman, finally climaxing as she kisses down Rayne's body.

The woman that listened to Rayne's love session tells Commander Brand about Rayne assaulting the soldier from earlier in exchange for running the brothel she works at since she hates the woman currently running it. Brand flirts with the woman, commenting on her beauty before biting her.

Back at the brothel, Rayne is fully dressed, as Nazi soldiers have arrived to kill Rayne. After cutting them down with her swords, she is reunited with Brand. Horrified to learn that she sired a Nazi vampire, she flees. The Nazis fire at Rayne, managing to hit her, though she brushes it off and escapes. This angers Brand, as he wants her alive. Dr. Mangler rushes to where Rayne was shot and collects her blood for more research.

Rayne gathers with Nathaniel by asking him for weapons, and dynamite but he refuses. Rayne and Nathaniel go to look for Magda Markovic in a bar, and she gives them some codes. Upon leaving, Rayne fights two vampires and kills them. Rayne has a nightmare about fighting Hitler, who is now a dhampir after biting her. Commander Brand talks to lieutenant Jaeger and bites him, so that the lieutenant can use his tracking skills combined with those of a vampire. Nathaniel and Rayne find Vasyl. Hearing Commander Brand is going to Berlin to create an army of vampires, lieutenant Jaeger finds them and attacks them, after which Rayne kills him.

The resistance fights the soldiers, but they capture Magda, and Brand tortures her by biting her. The resistance discovers that their hiding place was attacked upon learning that it was a distraction. Rayne attacks and kills soldiers. She and the resistance find Magda, but she is a vampire, and Rayne kills her. Then, the resistance escapes when attacked by vampire soldiers, but Nathaniel and Rayne are taken prisoner, where Mangler draws Rayne's blood.

Being transported in a truck to Berlin, Nathaniel takes care of a wounded Rayne, and they have sex. The resistance puts dynamite in the way to rescue Rayne and Nathaniel. Commander Brand drinks the previously gathered blood of Ranyne, in the fight, and Mangler escapes, but resistance sniper Natalia kills him. Finally, Rayne kills Brand, but she knows there is more work. In Berlin, Rayne, Nathaniel, and the resistance arrive at another Nazi base, surprising them.

== Cast ==
- Natassia Malthe as Rayne
- Michael Paré as Commander Ekart Brand
- Brendan Fletcher as Nathaniel Gregor
- Clint Howard as Dr. Wolfgang Mangler, Based On The Nazi Doctor Josef Mengele
- Willam Belli as Vasyl Tishenko
- Natalia Guslistaya as Natalia, The Sniper
- Annett Culp as Magda Marković
- Steffen Mennekes as Lieutenant Kaspar Jaeger
- Arved Birnbaum as Director
- Safiya Kaygin as Svetlana Koerk
- Nik Goldman as The Bartender
- Vjekoslav Katusin as German Soldier
- Goran Manić as Boris
- Fabrice Colson as Partisan
- Petar Benčić as Driver
- Boris Bakal as Adolf Hitler

== Production ==
Boll has originally planned to begin filming in Croatia in 2008 under the title BloodRayne 3: Warhammer, but it was later announced that filming would begin January 2010. The title was changed to BloodRayne: The Third Reich and shooting began in Zagreb, Croatia with Natassia Malthe and Michael Paré in the lead roles. Some speculation has it that a tie-in to the video game Nocturne is present through the character Svetlana who is a rumored vampire in a video post on YouTube.

Michael Paré has appeared in all three films in the BloodRayne franchise, but as different characters; Iancu, Pat Garrett and Commandant Ekart Brand respectively.

== Reception ==
Like the previous BloodRayne films, BloodRayne: The Third Reich received mostly negative reviews from critics. Main criticisms were towards the acting, script and Boll's direction.

== See also ==
- Vampire film
