= Knights of Bloodsteel =

- Genre: Fantasy
- Written by: Sam Egan
- Directed by: Phillip Spink
- Starring: David James Elliott; Natassia Malthe; Christopher Lloyd
- Countries of origin: Canada; United States
- Original language: English
- No. of episodes: 2

Production
- Production companies: Reunion Pictures; Dragonsteel Films; RHI Entertainment

Original release
- Network: SyFy
- Release: April 19, 2009

Knights of Bloodsteel is a 2009 television miniseries, produced by Reunion Pictures. RHI Entertainment distributed the project internationally.

It originally aired on April 19, 2009 on SyFy.

== Plot ==
In the faraway land of Mirabilis, the warlord Dragon-Eye has unleashed his terrifying forces to hunt down the source of all power, a legendary Crucible. With freedom hanging in the balance, a motley band of knights embarks on a dangerous mission to fight against the dreaded assassins, dragons and soldiers of Dragon-Eye and rescue their world from the clutches of evil once and for all. The knights include Adric, a con man; John Serragoth, a warrior for hire; Perfidia, an elven fighter who is the niece of a sorcerer who sits on the kingdom's governing council; and Ber-Lak, a goblin miner who has been infected by exposure to the mystical element known as bloodsteel.

== Cast ==
- David James Elliott: John Serragoth
- Michael Heltay: Grell
- Natassia Malthe: Perfidia
- Christopher Jacot: Adric
- Dru Viergever: Ber-Lak
- Peter Bryant: Swope
- Mark Gibbon: Dragon Eye
- Mackenzie Gray: Lord Splayven
- Heather Doerksen: Orion
- Christopher Lloyd: Tesselink
- Adrian Hough: Malcolm
- Gwynyth Walsh: Raven
- Julian Christopher: Oracle
- Gardiner Millar: Azenhawke
- Deanna Milligan: Maya
- Brenna O'Brien: Talia
- Ian A. Wallace: Klegg
- Leela Savasta: Fileen
- Robin T. Rose: Vosjek
- Stefany Mathias: Terrapine
- Matt Shaw: Angus
- Byron Lawson: Envoy
- Antony Holland: Old Merchant
- Mark Acheson: client
- John DeSantis: Goblin Strongarm
