= Lost Echo =

2013 video game

- Developer: KickBack Studios
- Publisher: KickBack Studios
- Engine: Unity
- Platforms: iOS, Windows Phone, Android
- Release: September 27, 2013
- Genres: Point-and-click adventure, Science fiction
- Mode: Single-player

Lost Echo is a point-and-click adventure developed and published by KickBack Studios for iOS, Android and Windows Phone. It was released on September 27, 2013, for iOS. Later it was also released for Windows Phone and Android on June 18, 2014, and November 11, 2015, respectively. The game has gained a cult following. On February 9, 2019, and February 19, 2019, the developers updated the game with a complete remaster of the game for iOS and Android respectively. As of 2024, KickBack Studios is developing a sequel, entitled Lost Echo: Resonance.

== Gameplay ==
As the game is a point-and-click adventure, the player has to solve puzzles in order to advance the plot. He can investigate certain objects and collect items. Furthermore, the player can talk to characters and find new hints in regard to the mystery.

== Plot ==
In the near future, a young woman named Chloe mysteriously disappears. Her boyfriend Gregory starts to investigate, but no one seems to remember her at all. At his home, Gregory finds that she has been erased from his life: pictures of her are missing and not a trace of Chloe exists. Gregory attempts to uncover what happened to Chloe by teaming up with friends and strangers and delving into a surreal, fantastical journey of espionage and time travel.

== Soundtrack ==
Lost Echo <OST>

Soundtrack album by KickBand
- Released: November 29, 2013
- Genre: Video game soundtrack
- Length: 59:56

The official soundtrack by KickBand was released on November 29, 2013. The soundtrack features 25 tracks at a total length of 59:56, and was released on Bandcamp.

No.	Title	Length
1.	"What will you find?"	01:42
2.	"How it begins"	03:28
3.	"Connecting Memories"	01:01
4.	"Cerebral Ambience"	03:43
5.	"Konstantinos Karagiannis - Main Menu Theme"	00:44
6.	"The Cell"	04:48
7.	"Alone Together"	01:00
8.	"His Dream"	03:03
9.	"Rejecting Reality"	01:27
10.	"Not Home"	02:26
11.	"Not Me"	01:06
12.	"Memory Clock"	01:24
13.	"Chapter 3"	02:15
14.	"Erik Satie - Gymnopedie"	02:38
15.	"Books"	02:48
16.	"Nothing"	01:05
17.	"Bad Plans"	03:19
18.	"Field Ambience"	02:22
19.	"Returning"	02:05
20.	"The Bar (do you like it?)"	02:04
21.	"Books (reprise)"	03:21
22.	"Searching"	03:23
23.	"Traveling without moving"	02:32
24.	"Alley"	03:36
25.	"Part of the truth"	02:25

== Reception ==
Reception

Aggregate score
Aggregator	Score
Metacritic	71/100

The game received generally favorable reviews. It received 4.5 out of 5 stars on Adventure Gamers with reviewer Randall Rigdon saying: ""A richly defined, innovative experience, Lost Echo is exactly what an iOS adventure should be." IndieGames.com wrote about the game: "I can't help but be completely and utterly impressed." 148Apps gave 4.5 of 5 stars and wrote: "This is a must-buy for anybody who loves sci-fi, mystery, or just adventure games in general." Gamezebo reviewer Jillian Werner wrote about the game: "[...] while its plot stumbles in the final act and its characters never fully get off the ground, the surrounding build-up and adventure is worth experiencing. Greg may not be the greatest protagonist adventure gaming has ever known, but his world and its challenges are beautiful, engaging, and deserving of exploration." PocketMeta gave it a 4.8/5, saying that it was, "stylish, philosophical, and intelligent" and "how a Sci-fi adventure should be." RPGFan gave it a 72% saying, "Despite decent production values, Lost Echo is a bit of a lost cause." AppSpy gave it a 3/5 saying it was, "A handsome adventure game with an enticing air of mystery let down by poor pacing and bland dialogue." It received a Metacritic score of 71/100.
