= BloodRayne 2: Deliverance =

2007 film by Uwe Boll

- DVD cover
- Directed by: Uwe Boll
- Written by: Christopher Donaldson; Neil Every
- Based on: BloodRayne series by Majesco and Terminal Reality
- Produced by: Dan Clarke; Shawn Williamson
- Starring: Natassia Malthe; Zack Ward; Chris Coppola; Michael Pare
- Cinematography: Mathias Neumann
- Edited by: Eric Hill
- Music by: Jessica de Rooij
- Production companies: Brightlight Pictures; Pitchblack Pictures; Event Film
- Distributed by: Event Film
- Release dates: September 18, 2007 (United States); November 30, 2007 (Germany)
- Running time: 99 minutes
- Countries: Canada; Germany
- Language: English

BloodRayne 2: Deliverance (also known as BloodRayne 2 or BloodRayne: Deliverance) is a 2007 direct-to-DVD Western horror action film set in 1880s America and directed by Uwe Boll. It is a sequel to the 2005 film BloodRayne, which was also directed by Boll, and stars Kristanna Loken. In Deliverance, Natassia Malthe replaces Loken in the lead role.

BloodRayne 2: Deliverance was released in the US on September 18, 2007 and in Germany on November 30. Like its predecessor, the film received negative reviews from critics.

== Plot ==
Newton Piles (Chris Coppola), a reporter on assignment for the Chicago Chronicle, has come to the town of Deliverance, Montana, to record tales of the Wild West. The peaceful and quiet town is expecting the arrival of the first Transcontinental Railroad in one week. Along with the railroad, however, arrives an unwelcome and deadly guest, a vampiric Billy the Kid. Using the railway, the 357-year-old Transylvanian vampire is building an army of cowboy vampires to take over the country and create a vampire kingdom in the New World. Billy and his horde go on a rampage, slaughtering townspeople and rounding up children. Billy spares Newton's life and promises Newton the greatest story ever told.

Billy's plans hit a snag when Rayne arrives in the town. Rayne is a Dhampir, the product of an unnatural union between a vampire and a human: she wields all the powers of a vampire, yet none of the weaknesses. Born over a century earlier in Romania, Rayne has hunted vampires for a long time and now she sets her sights on Billy.

== Cast ==
- Natassia Malthe as Rayne
- Zack Ward as Billy "The Kid"
- Michael Paré as Pat Garrett
- Chris Coppola as Newton Pyles
- Chris Spencer as Bob, the Bartender
- Brendan Fletcher as Muller
- Carrie Genzel as Bernadette
- Sarah-Jane Redmond as Martha
- Michael Teigen as "Slime Bag" Franson
- Michael Eklund as The Preacher
- John Novak as Sheriff Cobden
- Tyron Leitso as Fleetwood
- Jodelle Ferland as Sally
- Mike Dopud as Flintlock Hogan
- Cole Heppell as William

== Critical reception ==
Like its predecessor, BloodRayne 2: Deliverance received generally negative reviews. It holds a 0% rating on Rotten Tomatoes based on five reviews with critics panning it as: "Slow-paced, dry and anything but sexy."

== Sequel ==
A sequel titled BloodRayne: The Third Reich, also featuring Natassia Malthe, was released in 2011.

== See also ==
- Vampire film
