= BloodRayne 2 =

2004 action game

- Developer: Terminal Reality
- Publishers: Majesco; Terminal Cut/ReVamped; Ziggurat Interactive
- Producer: Raymond Holmes
- Designers: Raymond Holmes; Jeff Mills; Drew Haworth
- Programmers: Fletcher Dunn; Ken Rogoway
- Artist: Scott Wetterschneider
- Writers: Drew Haworth; Raymond Holmes; Jeff Mills; John Shirley
- Composer: Kyle Richards
- Series: BloodRayne
- Engine: Infernal Engine
- Platforms: PlayStation 2; Xbox; Windows; Terminal Cut; Windows; ReVamped; Nintendo Switch; PlayStation 4; PlayStation 5; Xbox One; Xbox Series X/S
- Release: PlayStation 2, Xbox; NA: October 12, 2004; EU: February 17, 2006; Windows; NA: August 2, 2005; EU: February 17, 2006; Terminal Cut; WW: November 20, 2020; ReVamped; WW: November 18, 2021
- Genres: Action, hack and slash
- Mode: Single-player

BloodRayne 2 is an action hack and slash video game developed by Terminal Reality for PlayStation 2, Xbox and Microsoft Windows. It does not follow on directly from where BloodRayne finished; instead, it takes place 60 and 70 years later in a contemporary 2000s setting.

A remastered version titled BloodRayne 2: Terminal Cut was released on November 20, 2020, and later on PlayStation 4, PlayStation 5, Xbox One and Nintendo Switch as BloodRayne 2: ReVamped on November 18, 2021.

== Plot ==
Shortly after the events of the first game, Rayne finds Brimstone headquarters personally sieged by her father, the vampire overlord Kagan. As Rayne confronts Kagan, the latter is torturing Professor Germain, a father figure within Brimstone who helped save Rayne as a child. Kagan reveals that Brimstone is holding the Vesper Shard, believing it can be weaponized against vampires. As Kagan gloats, Germain makes Rayne run, setting off an explosion seemingly killing Kagan. Denied the pleasure of killing Kagan herself, Rayne vows to destroy Kagan's legacy by killing the cult of his children.

Decades later, Rayne's quest to exterminate Kagan's remaining followers brings her to a city where the last of his children are operating. The Cult of Kagan are led by Rayne's vampiric half-sibling; her sisters, the ambitious Ephemera and the arrogant Ferrill; and her sycophantic brother, Xerxes. Rayne infiltrates a party hosted by one of her half brothers, Zerenksi, who lures the city's leaders and elites to be massacred. After Rayne kills Zerenski, she and her handler Severin observe numerous abductions across the cities as increasing vampire attacks are becoming more public and audacious.

During one such attack, Rayne encounters and briefly fights Ephemera. Reaching the city's sewer system, she faces Slezz, a towering vampiric monstrosity the cult uses to breed monstrous children. After killing Slezz, Rayne soon infiltrates a factory run by the cult, attempting to harness the Vesper Shroud, a substance that can render sun rays harmless to vampires, allowing them to surface at all times of the day, and which twists nature into a nightmarish perversion. Using the Shroud, the Cult has pledged to create a new era of vampiric supremacy, continuing Kagan's legacy, using abduction victims as "fuel" for the shroud.

On the factory's tower, Rayne faces Ferill, and despite her efforts, is incapacitated by debris. During which, it is revealed Kagan is still alive in the present day, operating behind the scenes and is now coming out of hiding. Unaware of Rayne's presence, Kagan blames Ferrill for the factory's disruption; it turns out Ephemera never told Kagan of Rayne so that Ferrill would lose face with him. As Kagan has Ferrill thrown off the tower to her supposed death, Kagan soon has the shroud activated; blotting out the sun, sending vampires and monsters to run amok in the city. Despite this, Rayne is almost ecstatic with the chance of finally facing Kagan.

Cut off from Brimstone, Rayne makes her way throughout the ruined city, fighting through Kagan's forces. Rayn soon confronts Ephemera, who reveals her intent on killing an usurping Kagan. However, Rayne manages to kill Ephemera herself in the ensuing fight. Later, Rayne discovers Ferrill has survived, who is rallying a sect of the cult to go to war as revenge against Kagan. As Ferrill leads her assault on Kagan's tower, Rayne uses the attack to infiltrate it. There, Ferrill is killed by Xerxes, using his invention, the Sun Gun. Xerxes dons a battle suit to fight Rayne, but is ultimately killed.

With only Kagan left, Rayne confronts him in his throne room. Recognizing the trouble Rayne caused him, Kagan bemoans the "effort it took" to create her, before finally facing Rayne in battle. Despite Kagan being empowered by the Vesper shard, Rayne manages to defeat and decapitate Kagan. Despite Kagan's death, the shroud remains, along with his vampire apocalypse. Rayne is informed by Severin that Brimstone has recovered, but has declared martial law and is cracking down on any vampire or related beings; including Rayne and Severin. Not only that, but other vampire lords are coming to claim Kagan's kingdom. At Severin's suggestion, Rayne takes Kagan's spot as "Empress" to continue her fight for humanity.

== Development ==
The game was developed by a team of around 20 people.

== Reception ==
Reception

Aggregate score
Aggregator	Score		
Aggregator	PC	PS2	Xbox
Metacritic	67/100	70/100	71/100

Review scores
Publication	Score		
Publication	PC	PS2	Xbox
Computer Games Magazine	2.5/5	N/A	N/A
Computer Gaming World	3/5	N/A	N/A
Electronic Gaming Monthly	N/A	6.33/10	6.33/10
Eurogamer	N/A	N/A	5/10
Game Informer	N/A	8/10	8/10
GamePro	N/A	3.5/5	3.5/5
GameSpot	6/10	7.3/10	7.3/10
GameSpy	N/A	3.5/5	3.5/5
GameZone	N/A	N/A	8.2/10
IGN	6.8/10	8/10	8/10
Official U.S. PlayStation Magazine	N/A	4.5/5	N/A
Official Xbox Magazine (US)	N/A	N/A	7.2/10
PC Gamer (US)	70%	N/A	N/A

BloodRayne 2 received "average" reviews on all platforms, according to the review aggregation website Metacritic.
