= Rayne (BloodRayne) =

- BloodRayne character
- Promotional artwork by EA Japan
- First game: BloodRayne
- Created by: Terminal Reality
- Voiced by: Laura Bailey; Jessie Seely (Betrayal (Note: Seely provided Rayne's vocal effects in the original version of Betrayal, while Bailey reprised for its Fresh Bites remaster))
- Portrayed by: Kristanna Loken (first film); Natassia Malthe (second and third films)

Rayne, sometimes called Agent BloodRayne or simply the Dhampir, is a fictional character in the BloodRayne series of video games. Created by Terminal Reality, she is the series' titular protagonist, appearing in both games and later extended media, such as comic books and films related to the series. She is primarily voiced by Laura Bailey in the video games, and was portrayed by Kristanna Loken in the first live action film, and by Natassia Malthe for its sequels.

== Conception and design ==
Rayne's early design

Rayne's character was inspired by an existing Terminal Reality character, the dhampir Svetlana Lupescu, who appeared in their 1999 game Nocturne. Described as initially having a "militant, dark gothic look [...] a brunette with tight buns in her hair and a very severe body line", the character went through several design changes, with an active goal to make her as appealing and distinctive as possible to create a franchise with lasting appeal. To this end they worked to give her a unique look, relying not only on making the character sexually appealing but also make her stand out in people's eyes, which producer Raymond Holmes her arm blades achieved. Her design was additionally intended to have a presence "both menacing and sexy at the same time", which he felt made her "a particularly strong female lead character with lots of attitude".

Majesco manager Liz Buckley in interviews said her designers had learned from focus groups that boys and young men not only liked female lead characters, but that they paid more attention to them. She added that "injecting sensuality" into Rayne's character design, describing her appearance as "lethal erotica" and adding that she felt no problem using the fact Rayne was "inherently sexy" to promote the character. Additional care for detail was done for her face, after noting focus groups wished to see it as compared to solely seeing the character from behind. Buckley went on to state "T&A will only get you so far", adding that while the character was aimed at a target audience of males ages seventeen to thirty-four, she felt the character had a female fan following as well due to being "empowering to play".

The character's in-game movements were animated by hand for the first title, and in the sequel were augmented by motion capture to "allow for more realist-looking movement". She added that with BloodRayne 2 the character model had also been heavily altered, adding "about one thousand" more polygons and using less on her hair to use more on her "curves and body line", as well as give her a more mature appearance. When questioned about the similarities between Rayne and another female vampire character Durham Red from the comic book series 2000 AD, game designer Joe Wampole stated that while similar they had not previously heard of the character, and added regarding their similar appearance "I think it is just natural to put a vamp chick in black leather and either color her hair black or red."

Laura Bailey described providing voice acting for the character as "a blast", though added she couldn't say she identified with the character. Bailey stated that during voice acting sessions, the director would occasionally approach her with changes to the game's script; if the dialogue was nasty enough to cause her to blush while saying the lines, he felt the change was good.

== Appearances ==
Rayne is a human vampire hybrid called a dhampir, born in 1915. Her human mother was raped by her vampire father, Kagan. Kagan later murdered her mother's entire family so that the only family member Rayne could turn to was him. This was a policy for all of the dhampir he sired or "created", possibly so that humans wouldn't revolt and use the vampiric weakness of the Sun, water, and holy relics against them. In the 1930s, she spent her teenage years trying to hunt down and kill her father, to avenge her family. She led a life of juvenile delinquency; using her vampiric powers and bloodlust to hunt down her father and avenge her mother. Her search led her to Europe, where she murdered several vampires before being apprehended. She claimed that her victims had been vampires, but was disbelieved by the authorities, but quickly managed to escape from them and continue her hunt. Recognizing her dhampir nature as well as her skills at hunting vampires, she was recruited into the mysterious Brimstone Society via an invitation. The Brimstone Society sent her on missions to eliminate supernatural threats to the world, including those involving vampires as well as demons and unnatural apex predators. One of these missions required her to use her vampiric powers against the Nazis during World War II, who were on the verge of using magical artifacts to bring the demon lord Beliar back to life. Rayne also learned of a plan to use demonic parasites called 'Daemites' against the enemies of the Nazis, after they had been tested on prisoners. The background to the story is influenced by the existence of various historically real Nazi occult groups such as the Thule society.

=== In other media ===
In the first BloodRayne movie that came out in 2005, she is played by actress Kristanna Loken. The movie's setting and date is different from the video games, instead of her being an American dhampir born in the 20th century, she is a Romanian dhampir born in the 18th century. The storyline is also different from the video games, as she joins the Brimstone Society in the movie while also tracking down her father Kagan (played by Sir Ben Kingsley) in the movie. She also falls in love with Sebastian (played by Matthew Davis) who is a part of the Brimstone Society too.

In the sequel to the first film BloodRayne 2: Deliverance, Loken was replaced by actress Natassia Malthe and just like her video game counterpart, she has an American accent. In the film she takes on Billy the Kid in 19th century USA and is helped by Pat Garrett in the town of Deliverance. She also meets Muller, who is one of the current members of the Brimstone Society in the 19th century.

In the third film: BloodRayne: The Third Reich, Malthe reprises her role. In the film she fights against the Nazis in Europe during World War II, encountering Director Ekart Brand, a Nazi leader whose goal is to inject Adolf Hitler with Rayne's blood in an attempt to transform him into an all powerful dhampir and attain immortality. She joins the French resistance group, whose leader, Nathaniel (played by Brendan Fletcher), falls in love with her.

In 2005, Rayne appeared in Majesco's Infected as an unlockable character. When asked if she had a storyline of her own for the title, Majesco producer Dean Martinetti stated no, adding that the game's protagonist "just happens" to resemble the character.

Rayne is the first video game character that appeared in Playboy, in the October 2004 U.S. edition as part of an article entitled "Gaming Grows Up". She has also made appearance in MTV's "Video Mods", which a music video portrayed her performing Evanescence's song "Everybody's Fool". Majesco's vice president of marketing Ken Gold said: "Having BloodRayne as one of the premiere 'performers' in MTV2's 'Video Mods' show is a testament to her popularity and appeal." In 2009, a model dressed as Rayne was one of several characters featured as part of a "Video Game Girls" burlesque show at bar The Bordello in Los Angeles, as a tie-in to the year's Electronic Entertainment Expo event. Rayne also appear in a cameo scene in the 2018 film Ready Player One.

== Promotion and reception ==
Electronic Gaming Monthly decried her appearance in Playboy, stating that further similar exhibitions would damage how the public perceived the character.

UGO.com described her as one of the "Top 50 Sexiest Vampires", which noted that while she represented a negative aspect of video games in 2002, a "scantily-clad heroine in a graphically violent third-person adventure", her feature in Playboy despite not being real meant "they did something right".
