= BloodRayne =

- The BloodRayne logo from the first game onwards
- Genre: Action-adventure
- Developers: Terminal Reality; WayForward Technologies; Abstraction Games
- Publishers: Majesco; Vivendi Universal Games; Midnight City; Ziggurat Interactive
- Platforms: GameCube; macOS; Microsoft Windows; Nintendo Switch; PlayStation 2; PlayStation 3; PlayStation 4; PlayStation 5; Xbox; Xbox 360; Xbox One; Xbox Series
- First release: BloodRayne; October 31, 2002
- Latest release: BloodRayne 2: ReVamped; November 18, 2021

BloodRayne is a media franchise that originated with an action-adventure video game series originally developed by Terminal Reality and published by Majesco which began with the game of the same name in 2002.

The franchise focuses on Rayne, a dhampir working for the Brimstone Society, a secret fraternity of individuals who works to protect humanity from supernatural threats. Additional media has been developed for the franchise in the form of film adaptations and comics.

== Titles ==
=== Games ===
Release timeline
2002	BloodRayne
2003
2004	BloodRayne 2
2005
2006
2007
2008
2009
2010
2011	BloodRayne: Betrayal
2012
2013
2014
2015
2016
2017
2018
2019
2020	BloodRayne: Terminal Cut
2020	BloodRayne 2: Terminal Cut
2021	Betrayal - Fresh Bites
2021	BloodRayne: ReVamped
2021	BloodRayne 2: ReVamped
2022
2023
2024
2025
2026	BloodRayne: Definitive Collection

- BloodRayne (2002) : set in 1933 and 1938, just before World War II. As an agent of the Brimstone Society, Rayne is sent to a variety of locations like a small swamp town in Louisiana, a Nazi fortress in Argentina, or an ancient castle in Germany, to battle supernatural creatures as well as the Nazi army.
  - In 2020, a remastered version of the game was released on PC under the title BloodRayne: Terminal Cut, and the following year on consoles as BloodRayne: ReVamped.
- BloodRayne 2 (2004) : The game's plot features Rayne confronting her father vampire, Kagan. Rayne's half-siblings have banded together to form a group called the Cult of Kagan, who have pledged to create a new era of vampire supremacy.
  - In 2020, a remastered version of the game was released on PC under the title BloodRayne 2: Terminal Cut, and the following year on consoles as BloodRayne 2: ReVamped.
- BloodRayne: Betrayal (2011) : A downloadable sidescrolling game.
  - An enhanced version was released in 2021 under the title BloodRayne: Betrayal - Fresh Bites.
- BloodRayne: Definitive Collection (2026) : A compilation of all three games' remastered releases.

=== Cancelled games ===
A fourth game, titled BloodRayne: The Shroud, was in development for the Nintendo 3DS. The game was put "on hold" due to Betrayal's low sales. An original entry for the PlayStation Portable was also in development, but cancelled in late 2005 due to Majesco's financial issues at the time.

=== Future ===
In summer 2020, Ziggurat Interactive bought the rights to the BloodRayne franchise and other titles from Majesco and intends to revive the series with Terminal Reality.

== Common elements ==
=== Rayne ===
Rayne, sometimes called Agent BloodRayne, is a fictional character in the series. She is the series' titular protagonist, appearing in both games and later extended media, such as comic books and films related to the series. In English, she is voiced by Laura Bailey in BloodRayne and BloodRayne 2 and Jessie Seely in BloodRayne: Betrayal.

Rayne is a human vampire hybrid called a dhampir, born 1915. Her human mother was raped by her vampire father, Kagan. Kagan later murdered her mother's entire family so that the only family member Rayne could turn to was him. Recognizing her dhampir nature as well as her skills at hunting vampires, she was recruited into the mysterious Brimstone Society via an invitation. The Brimstone Society sent her on missions to eliminate supernatural threats to the world, including those involving vampires as well as demons and unnatural apex predators.

== Other media ==
=== Films adaptations ===
A film adaptation was released on January 6, 2006, directed by Uwe Boll and starring Kristanna Loken as Rayne and Ben Kingsley as Kagan. The film is set in the 1800s and follows Rayne's quest to stop her father Kagan's nefarious schemes to slaughter mankind. Boll had previously directed other video-game-to-movie adaptations including House of the Dead and Alone in the Dark.

The film was followed by two direct-to-DVD sequels starring Natassia Malthe; 2007's BloodRayne 2: Deliverance and 2011's BloodRayne: The Third Reich. In addition, Boll directed the parody film, Blubberella, which was also released in 2011.

=== Comics ===
Several BloodRayne comic books have been published by Digital Webbing. In addition, Rayne was the first video game character to appear topless in Playboy.
