= BloodRayne: Betrayal =

2011 video game

- Developer: WayForward
- Publishers: Majesco; Midnight City (PC); Fresh Bites; Ziggurat Interactive
- Directors: Matt Bozon; Sean Velasco
- Producer: Robb Alvey
- Designer: Sean Velasco
- Programmer: Lee McDole
- Artist: Matt Bozon
- Composer: Jake Kaufman
- Series: BloodRayne
- Platforms: PlayStation 3; Xbox 360; Windows; Fresh Bites; Windows; Nintendo Switch; PlayStation 4; PlayStation 5; Xbox One; Xbox Series X/S
- Release: PlayStation 3, Xbox 360; September 7, 2011; Windows; April 30, 2014; Fresh Bites; September 9, 2021
- Genres: Action, platform, hack & slash
- Mode: Single-player

BloodRayne: Betrayal is a 2D side-scrolling action game released in 2011 for PlayStation 3, Xbox 360 and Windows. Arc System Works published the PlayStation 3 version in Japan under the name BloodRayne: Crimson Slayer (Note: BloodRayne: Crimson Slayer (ブラッドレイン 深紅の叛逆者(クリムゾンスレイヤー), BuraddoRein Kurimuzonsureiyā)) on May 1, 2014.

An enhanced version with the subtitle Fresh Bites was released on PlayStation 4, PlayStation 5, Xbox One, Xbox Series, Nintendo Switch and Windows on September 9, 2021.

== Gameplay ==
BloodRayne: Betrayal is a side-scrolling platform game that keeps the hack and slash combat of the previous games in the series. The player controls Rayne through 15 "Chapters". With Rayne's arm blades and a handgun, the game will lock players in rooms full of enemies that will need to be taken down to progress through the levels. There are no new obtainable combat skills or new weapons throughout the game (aside from a light cannon that can be swapped with the handgun). The player can also find some collectibles that give upgrades like more ammo to the handgun.

Also, a great portion of the game's levels requires the players to be jumping from platform to platform, avoiding spikes, learning enemy placement, and projectiles in order to clear each "Chapter". Each one of the levels has multiple checkpoints that will replenish Rayne's life bar when you reach them. The player will be brought back to the checkpoint if all Rayne's health gauge is depleted or the player falls into a hole/acid pit/spikes etc. The health gauge can only be restored sucking the blood of some types of enemies after weakened them, the game does not feature any other item that can replenish health.

== Plot ==
Rayne, a dhampir, is recruited by the vampire hunting Brimstone Society to infiltrate a ball with the help of a mysterious friend.

== Fresh Bites ==
Announced at Limited Run Games' E3 2021 show, BloodRayne: Betrayal – Fresh Bites has updated 4K visuals, improved difficulty, and now fully voiced with Laura Bailey and Troy Baker reprising their roles as Rayne and Kagan respectively alongside more from the likes of Todd Haberkorn and Patrick Seitz to "bring new life to the original written dialog."

== Reception ==
Reception

Aggregate score
Aggregator	Score	
Aggregator	PS3	Xbox 360
Metacritic	69/100	68/100

Review scores
Publication	Score	
Publication	PS3	Xbox 360
Destructoid	2/10	N/A
Edge	N/A	8/10
Eurogamer	7/10	7/10
Game Informer	7/10	7/10
GamePro	3.5/5	3.5/5
GameRevolution	C	C
GameSpot	5.5/10	5.5/10
GameZone	N/A	5/10
IGN	9/10	9/10
Joystiq	4.5/5	N/A
Official Xbox Magazine (US)	N/A	6.5/10
PlayStation: The Official Magazine	6/10	N/A
411Mania	8.5/10	N/A
Metro	N/A	5/10

The PS3 and Xbox 360 versions received "average" reviews, according to the review aggregation website Metacritic. Whereas some reviewers, such as those writing for Joystiq and IGN, praised the challenge of it, others, such as GameSpot, felt it was too frustrating. Games journalist James Stephanie Sterling went so far as putting it on her top 10 worst games of 2011 for its terrible controls and handling and obscene number of enemies thrown at the player.

411Mania gave the PS3 version 8.5 out of ten and called it "a fantastic experience that old-school gamers shouldn't pass up". However, The Digital Fix gave the same console version 6 out of 10 and said it "will appeal to a particular kind of gaming masochist [...] For the rest of us, the imprecise controls, frequent deaths and lack of a difficulty selector make this an experience just too frustrating to be enjoyable". Metro gave the Xbox 360 version five out of ten: "Never has so promising a game been ruined by such a perversely high difficulty level, which is a crying shame given the gorgeous 2D art".

Fresh Bites was given 6 out of 10.
