= Natassia Malthe =

Norwegian actress

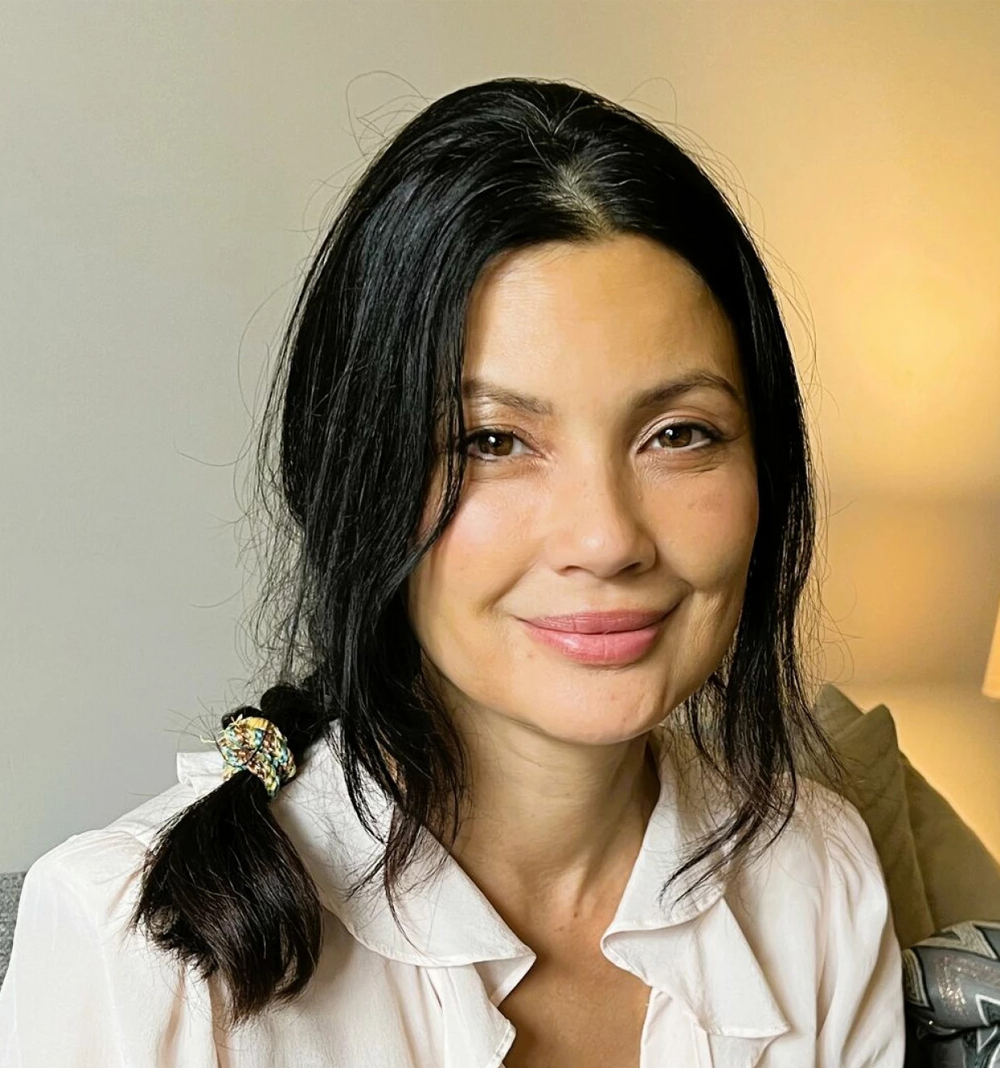
- Malthe in 2024
- Born: Natassia Linn Malthe; Oslo, Norway
- Occupations: Model, actress, acting coach, director, and writer.
- Years active: 1996–present

Natassia Linn Malthe (/nəˈtɑːʃə/) is a Norwegian-Canadian actress and model.

== Early life and career ==
Natassia Malthe is an actress and model of Norwegian and Canadian descent. She trained in ballet at the Goh Ballet Academy in Canada and the Norwegian National Opera and Ballet. She later moved to London to study musical theater before relocating to Los Angeles to pursue her acting career.

Malthe's career in the entertainment industry took off in the late 1990s. She made her film debut in Disturbing Behavior (1998) and gained recognition for her roles in action and fantasy films, including Elektra (2005), where she starred alongside Jennifer Garner, and the BloodRayne series.

In recent years, Malthe shifted her focus toward directing and obtained a Bachelor's degree in Film and Television from Kristianna University College (Westerdals) in Oslo, Norway, in 2024.

In 2017, Malthe joined numerous other women in accusing film producer Harvey Weinstein of sexual improprieties.

== Filmography ==
=== Film ===
Year	Title	Role	Notes
1998	Disturbing Behavior	Mary Jo Copeland	
1999	Lake Placid	Janine	
2000	Me, Myself & Irene	Bikini Girl	
2001	Trapped	Marisa	TV movie
2001	The Wedding Dress	Lula	TV movie
2002	40 Days and 40 Nights	Girl in Bed	
2002	Stark Raving Mad	Stacie	
2002	Halloween: Resurrection	French Maid	
2002	K-9: P.I.	Dirty Dancer	Video
2003	A Guy Thing	Melanie	
2004	Call Me: The Rise and Fall of Heidi Fleiss	Charisse	TV movie
2004	Chicks with Sticks	Marcie Rutledge	
2005	Elektra	Typhoid	
2005	Betrayed A.K.A Bound By Lies	Randi Fuller	Video
2005	Confessions of a Sociopathic Social Climber	Frangiapani	TV movie
2005	Awake	Rebecca	
2005	The Beautiful Lady Without Mercy	The Lady	Short
2005	Bloodsuckers	Quintana	TV movie
2005	Chaos	Gina Lopez	
2005	Devil's Highway	Michelle	
2006	Skinwalkers	Sonja	
2006	DOA: Dead or Alive	Ayane	
2006	Dead and Deader	Dr. Boyce	TV movie
2007	Sex and Death 101	Bambi	
2007	BloodRayne 2: Deliverance	Rayne	
2008	The Other Side of the Tracks	Lucinda	
2008	Alone in the Dark II	Turner	Video
2009	Slave A.K.A Wish You Were Here	Georgie	
2010	Percy Jackson & the Olympians: The Lightning Thief	Lotus Land Waitress	
2011	BloodRayne: The Third Reich	Rayne	Video
2011	In the Name of the King 2: Two Worlds	Manhattan	
2012	This Means War	Xenia	
2012	Avarice A.K.A BlackBox	Mary	
2012	Dragon's Rage A.K.A Knights of Bloodsteel	Perfidia	Video
2013	Assault on Wall Street	Molly	
2013	Vikingdom	Brynna	
2014	Klinik unter Palmen	Lea Sass	TV movie
2015	The Good, the Bad and the Dead A.K.A 4Got10	Christine	
2018	Battle Drone	Valkyrie	
2018	Alpha	Rho	
2021	Last Man Down	Zahara	
2023	Holiday Boyfriend	Mandy	
2024	Førtis - en romantisk komedie	Vanessa	Short

=== Television ===
Year	Title	Role	Notes
1997	Millennium	New Leslie	Episode: "Loin Like a Hunting Flame"
1998	Viper	Trixie	Episode: "Holy Matrimony"
1998	First Wave	Maid	Episode: "Hotel California"
2000	Dark Angel	Redhead at Party	Episode: "Pilot"
2000	2gether	Jody	Episode: "Dumped"
2001	Los Luchadores	Princess Sophia	Episode: "Anxiety Attacks"
2001	Seven Days	Lana	Episode: "Live: From Death Row"
2002	The Chris Isaak Show	Olivia Ulmer	Episode: "Family Ties"
2004	The Dead Zone	Tyler	Episode: "Shadows"
2004	Andromeda	Tolek	Episode: "So Burn the Untamed Lands"
2007	Fallen	Gadreel	Recurring Cast
2009	Knights of Bloodsteel	Perfidia	Episode: "Part I & II"
2009	The Assistants	Tabitha Tinsdale	Episode: "Rehab"
2010	Fringe	Linda	Episode: "What Lies Below"
2022	The Pact	Freya	Main Cast
