= BloodRayne (video game) =

2002 video game

- Developer: Terminal Reality
- Publishers: NA: Majesco; EU: Vivendi Universal Games; Terminal Cut/ReVamped; Ziggurat Interactive
- Producer: Jeff Mills
- Designer: Joe Wampole
- Programmer: Fletcher Dunn
- Artist: Chris DeSimone
- Writers: Peter Besson; Joe Wampole
- Composer: Kyle Richards
- Series: BloodRayne
- Engine: Infernal Engine
- Platforms: PlayStation 2; Xbox; GameCube; Windows; Mac OS X; Terminal Cut; Windows; ReVamped; Nintendo Switch; PlayStation 4; PlayStation 5; Xbox One; Xbox Series X/S
- Release: PlayStation 2, Xbox; NA: October 31, 2002; EU: May 2, 2003; GameCube; NA: October 31, 2002; EU: May 23, 2003; Windows; EU: May 2, 2003; NA: September 9, 2003; Mac OS X; NA: May 2, 2003; Terminal Cut; WW: November 20, 2020; ReVamped; WW: November 18, 2021
- Genres: Action, hack and slash
- Mode: Single-player

BloodRayne is an action-adventure hack and slash video game developed by Terminal Reality and released on October 31, 2002. The game has since spawned a franchise with the addition of sequels, films, and self-contained comic books.

A remastered version was released on November 20, 2020 as BloodRayne: Terminal Cut by Terminal Reality and Ziggurat Interactive, and later on PlayStation 4, PlayStation 5, Xbox One, Xbox Series and Nintendo Switch as BloodRayne: ReVamped on November 18, 2021.

== Plot ==
In 1933, while searching for her vampire father, dhampir Rayne is recruited by the Brimstone Society, a secret society that monitors and combats supernatural threats to humanity. For her first mission, Rayne is deployed to the town of Mortton, Louisiana, to investigate reports of a plague that is transforming local residents into zombie-like mutants. She is accompanied by Mynce, her mentor and fellow dhampir.

In Mortton, Rayne finds the town infested by spider-like monsters called Maraisreq, one of which devours and apparently kills Mynce. After killing the "queen" Maraisreq, Rayne finds a strange glowing rib in its corpse; when she touches it, the rib immediately implants itself into her own torso. Before she can recover from the shock, Rayne is attacked by a man in a Nazi uniform who forcibly removes the rib from her body and leaves her for dead, although she survives.

Five years later, in 1938, Brimstone sends Rayne to Argentina to perform reconnaissance at a mining facility where the Nazis are rumored to be searching for a mystical relic of great power. Brimstone provides Rayne with a target list of high-ranking Nazi officers to assassinate, one of whom she recognizes as the man who attacked her in Louisiana: Jürgen Wulf, leader of the Gegengeist Gruppe (G.G.G.; literally "Anti-Ghost Group"), the Nazi counterparts of Brimstone who seek to harness occult powers for the Third Reich. A Thule Society high priest tells Rayne that the Nazis are searching the mine for the skull of Beliar, a legendary king of Atlantis, whom the Nazis revere as the pinnacle of Aryan superiority.

As Rayne descends into the mine, she discovers that the facility has been overrun by "Daemites," demonic parasites that take humans as hosts and serve to guard Beliar's skull. Deep within the mine, Rayne locates the crystal skull containing Beliar's eye, the true relic, which implants itself into her head, enhancing her vision. One of Rayne's targets, the cyborg Mauler, informs her that Beliar was not an Atlantean king at all, but was in fact the original devil. Beliar was overthrown by Mephisto, who dismembered him and scattered his body parts across the world. The rib from the queen Maraisreq is one of these parts, as is the eye from the mine, but the most powerful relic is Beliar's heart, which can summon the demon himself. Mauler boasts that the heart is buried beneath Castle Gaustadt in Germany, where Wulf will soon excavate it. The Nazis collapse the mine in order to destroy the Daemites, and Rayne departs for Germany to confront Wulf and prevent the G.G.G. from summoning Beliar.

Unbeknownst to the Nazis, Castle Gaustadt is home to a clan of ancient vampires that, after centuries in isolation, have evolved into bestial monsters. One of these vampires, Hedrox, manages to obtain Beliar's heart, but does not know how to access its powers. While the feral vampires and Nazi soldiers attack each other, Rayne fights her way into the castle, where she encounters Mynce. Mynce reveals that she faked her death in order to infiltrate the G.G.G. and has been working as a double agent for Brimstone ever since. She warns Rayne that Wulf has already absorbed several of Beliar's relics into his own body, making him extremely dangerous. Shortly afterward, Wulf ambushes and kills Mynce, ripping her heart out in front of Rayne. A furious Rayne swears revenge on Wulf and pursues him into the castle's cathedral.

In the cathedral, Rayne confronts Wulf and Hedrox. Hedrox consumes Beliar's heart, inadvertently summoning the demon into his own body. The revived Beliar demands that Rayne and Wulf return his stolen body parts, leading to a three-way fight between them. After a pitched battle, Rayne decapitates Wulf and banishes Beliar, leaving only his still-beating heart behind. Rayne briefly appears tempted by the power of Beliar's heart, but ultimately disposes of it by kicking it down a storm drain.

Brimstone are pleased by Rayne's success and note that she deserves a rest, but they caution against the growing threat posed by another, even greater evil: Rayne's father, whom Brimstone has finally located.

== Development ==
The game had a development budget of $2 million. The total budget was $6 million to $7 million. Development time was more than two years.

== Reception ==
Aggregate score
Aggregator	Score			
Aggregator	GameCube	PC	PS2	Xbox
Metacritic	73/100	65/100	75/100	76/100

Review scores
Publication	Score			
Publication	GameCube	PC	PS2	Xbox
Computer Games Magazine	N/A	2.5/5	N/A	N/A
Computer Gaming World	N/A	2/5	N/A	N/A
Eurogamer	N/A	N/A	N/A	6/10
Famitsu	N/A	N/A	29/40	N/A
Game Informer	7/10	N/A	8/10	7.75/10
GamePro	4/5	N/A	4.5/5	4.5/5
GameSpot	7.2/10	5.6/10	7.2/10	7.2/10
GameSpy	3/5	3/5	3/5	3/5
GameZone	8.8/10	7.6/10	8.4/10	8.1/10
IGN	7.8/10	7.3/10	7.5/10	7.8/10
Nintendo Power	2.9/5	N/A	N/A	N/A
Official U.S. PlayStation Magazine	N/A	N/A	4/5	N/A
Official Xbox Magazine (US)	N/A	N/A	N/A	6.8/10
PC Gamer (US)	N/A	58%	N/A	N/A
Entertainment Weekly	A−	N/A	A−	A−
Maxim	4/5	N/A	4/5	4/5

The PlayStation 2 and Xbox versions of BloodRayne received "generally favorable reviews", while the GameCube and PC versions received "mixed or average reviews", according to the review aggregation website Metacritic. Electronic Gaming Monthly gave the PS2 version 7, 7.5 and 7.5 for a total of 7.33 out of 10. In Japan, where the same console version was ported and published by Electronic Arts on August 26, 2004, Famitsu gave it a score of 29 out of 40.
