= Index of Windows games (M) =

This is an index of Microsoft Windows games.

This list has been split into multiple pages. Please use the Table of Contents to browse it.

| Title | Released | Developer | Publisher |
|---|---|---|---|
| M.A.S.S. Builder | 2019 | Vermillion Digital | Sekai Project |
| M.I.A.: Mission in Asia | 2011 | Burut Software | GFI |
| M1 Tank Platoon II | 1998 | Microprose | Microprose |
| Mace Griffin: Bounty Hunter | 2004 | Warthog Games | Vivendi Universal |
| Machinarium | 2009 | Amanita Design | Amanita Design |
| Machine Hunter | 1997 | Eurocom Entertainment Software | MGM Interactive |
| Machines | 1999 | Charybdis Limited | Acclaim Entertainment |
| Mad Dog II: The Lost Gold | 2003 | American Laser Games, Inc. | Selectsoft Publishing |
| Mad Max | 2015 | Avalanche Studios | Warner Bros. Interactive Entertainment |
| Mad Tracks | 2006 | Load Inc. | Micro Application |
| Mad Trax | 1998 | RayLand Interactive | Project Two Interactive BV |
| Madagascar | 2005 | Toys for Bob | Activision |
| Madden NFL 97 | 1996 | EA Tiburon | EA Sports |
| Madden NFL 98 | 1997 | EA Tiburon | EA Sports |
| Madden NFL 99 | 1998 | EA Tiburon | EA Sports |
| Madden NFL 2000 | 1999 | EA Tiburon | EA Sports |
| Madden NFL 2001 | 2000 | EA Tiburon | EA Sports |
| Madden NFL 2002 | 2001 | EA Tiburon, Budcat Creations | EA Sports |
| Madden NFL 2003 | 2002 | EA Tiburon | EA Sports |
| Madden NFL 2004 | 2003 | EA Tiburon | EA Sports |
| Madden NFL 2005 | 2004 | EA Tiburon | EA Sports |
| Madden NFL 06 | 2005 | EA Tiburon | EA Sports |
| Madden NFL 07 | 2006 | EA Tiburon, EA Canada | EA Sports |
| Madden NFL 08 | 2007 | EA Tiburon | EA Sports |
| Madden NFL 19 | 2018 | EA Tiburon | EA Sports |
| Madden NFL 20 | 2019 | EA Tiburon | EA Sports |
| Made Man | 2007 | SilverBack Studios | Mastertronic |
| MADiSON | 2022 | Bloodious Games | Bloodious Games, Perpetual Games |
| Maelstrom: The Battle for Earth Begins | 2007 | KD Vision | Codemasters |
| Maestro | 2004 | Mike Oldfield | Mike Oldfield |
| Mafia | 2002 | Illusion Softworks | Gathering of Developers |
| Mafia II | 2010 | 2K Czech | 2K Games |
| Mafia III | 2016 | Hangar 13 | 2K |
| Mafia: Definitive Edition | 2020 | Hangar 13 | 2K |
| Mage Arena | 2025 | jrsjams | jrsjams |
| Mage Knight: Apocalypse | 2006 | InterServ | Namco Bandai Games |
| MageSlayer | 1997 | Raven Software | GT Interactive |
| Magic and Mayhem | 1998 | Mythos Games | Virgin Interactive, Bethesda Softworks |
| The Magic Circle | 2015 | Question | Question |
| Magic: The Gathering | 1997 | MicroProse | MicroProse |
| Magic: The Gathering – Battlegrounds | 2003 | Secret Level, Inc. | Atari |
| Magic: The Gathering – Duels of the Planeswalkers | 2009 | Stainless Games | Wizards of the Coast |
| Magic: The Gathering Online | 2002 | Leaping Lizard Software, Wizards of the Coast | Wizards of the Coast |
| Magicka | 2011 | Arrowhead Game Studios | Paradox Interactive |
| Magna Carta: The Phantom of Avalanche | 2001 | Softmax | Wizard Soft |
| Magnant | 2006 | Mohydine Entertainment | Mohydine Entertainment |
| Magrunner: Dark Pulse | 2013 | Frogwares | Frogwares |
| Mahjong Tales: Ancient Wisdom | 2007 | Creat Studios | Creat Studios, TikGames |
| Maid of Sker | 2020 | Wales Interactive | Wales Interactive |
| Maize | 2016 | Finish Line Games | Finish Line Games |
| Majestic | 2001 | Anim-X | Electronic Arts |
| Majesty: The Fantasy Kingdom Sim | 2000 | Cyberlore Studios | Hasbro Interactive |
| Majesty 2: The Fantasy Kingdom Sim | 2009 | 1C:Ino-Co | Paradox Interactive |
| Majo-tachi no Nemuri -Kanzenban- | 1996 | | Victor Interactive Software |
| Major League Baseball 2K9 | 2009 | Visual Concepts | 2K Sports |
| Making History: The Calm & The Storm | 2007 | Muzzy Lane | Muzzy Lane |
| The Making of Karateka | 2023 | Digital Eclipse | Digital Eclipse |
| Maldita Castilla | 2012 | Locomalito | Locomalito |
| Mall of America Tycoon | 2004 | 4HEAD Studios | Activision Value |
| Mall Tycoon | 2002 | Holistic Design, Inc. | Take-Two Interactive |
| Maneater | 2020 | Tripwire Interactive | Tripwire Interactive |
| Manhunt | 2003 | Rockstar North | Rockstar Games |
| Manic Miner | 1997 | Matthew Smith | Software Projects |
| Manx TT Super Bike | 1997 | Sega-AM3, Sega-AM4 | Sega |
| MapleStory | 2003 | Wizet | Nexon |
| MapleStory 2 | 2018 | NSquare | Nexon |
| Marathon 2: Durandal | 1996 | Bungie | Bungie |
| Marble Blast Gold | 2003 | GarageGames | Monster Studios |
| Marble Drop | 1997 | Maxis | Maxis |
| Marc Ecko's Getting Up: Contents Under Pressure | 2006 | The Collective | Atari |
| Mare Nostrum | 2008 | Sandstorm Productions | Valve |
| Mari0 | 2012 | Maurice Guégan | Stabyourself.net |
| Mario's Game Gallery | 1995 | Presage Software, Inc. | Interplay Entertainment |
| Marlow Briggs and the Mask of Death | 2013 | ZootFly, Microsoft Studios | 505 Games |
| Mars: War Logs | 2013 | Spiders | Focus Home Interactive |
| Martha Is Dead | 2022 | LKA | Wired Productions |
| Martian Gothic: Unification | 2000 | Creative Reality | TalonSoft |
| Marvel Trading Card Game | 2007 | Vicious Cycle Software | Konami |
| Marvel: Ultimate Alliance | 2006 | Beenox Studios | Activision |
| Mashed | 2004 | Supersonic Software | Empire Interactive |
| Mass Effect | 2007 | BioWare | Microsoft Game Studios |
| Mass Effect 2 | 2010 | BioWare | Microsoft Game Studios, Electronic Arts |
| Mass Effect 3 | 2012 | BioWare | Electronic Arts |
| Mass Effect Legendary Edition | 2021 | BioWare | Electronic Arts |
| Mass Effect: Andromeda | 2017 | BioWare | Electronic Arts |
| Massive Assault | 2003 | Wargaming | Matrix Games |
| Master of Magic | 2022 | MuHa Games | Slitherine Software |
| Master of Orion: Conquer the Stars | 2016 | Nimble Giant Entertainment | Wargaming |
| Master of Orion II: Battle at Antares | 1996 | Simtex | Microprose |
| Master of Orion III | 2003 | Quicksilver Software | Infogrames |
| Master of the Skies: The Red Ace | 2000 | Fiendish Games | Small Rockets |
| Math Blaster Episode I: In Search of Spot | 1993 | Davidson & Associates | Davidson & Associates |
| Math Blaster Episode II: Secret of the Lost City | 1994 | Davidson & Associates | Davidson & Associates |
| The Matrix: Path of Neo | 2005 | Shiny Entertainment | Atari |
| Matt Hayes Fishing | 2002 | Electronic Arts | Electronic Arts |
| Maui Mallard in Cold Shadow | 1996 | Eurocom | Disney Interactive |
| The Maw | 2009 | Twisted Pixel Games | Microsoft |
| Max Payne | 2001 | Remedy Entertainment | Gathering of Developers |
| Max Payne 2: The Fall of Max Payne | 2003 | Remedy Entertainment | Rockstar Games |
| Max Payne 3 | 2012 | Rockstar Studios | Rockstar Games |
| Maximum-Football | 2006 | Wintervalley Software | Matrix Games |
| MDK | 1997 | Shiny Entertainment | Shiny Entertainment |
| MDK2 | 2000 | BioWare | Interplay Entertainment |
| MechCommander | 1998 | FASA Interactive | MicroProse |
| MechCommander 2 | 2001 | FASA Interactive | Microsoft |
| MechWarrior 2: 31st Century Combat | 1995 | Activision | Activision |
| MechWarrior 3 | 1999 | Zipper Interactive | Hasbro Interactive |
| MechWarrior 4: Vengeance | 2000 | FASA Interactive | Microsoft |
| MechWarrior 4: Mercenaries | 2002 | Cyberlore Studios, FASA Studio | Microsoft Games Studios |
| Medal of Honor | 2010 | Danger Close Games | Electronic Arts |
| Medal of Honor: Airborne | 2007 | EA Los Angeles | Electronic Arts |
| Medal of Honor: Allied Assault | 2002 | 2015 | Electronic Arts |
| Medal of Honor: Pacific Assault | 2004 | EA Los Angeles, TKO Software | EA Games |
| Medal of Honor: Warfighter | 2012 | Danger Close Games | Electronic Arts |
| Medieval Conquest | 2004 | Cat Daddy Games | Global Star Software |
| Medieval Dynasty | 2021 | Render Cube | Toplitz Productions |
| Medieval Lords: Build, Defend, Expand | 2005 | Monte Cristo Multimedia | Monte Cristo Multimedia |
| Medieval: Total War | 2002 | The Creative Assembly | Activision |
| Medieval II: Total War | 2006 | The Creative Assembly | Sega |
| Medieval II: Total War: Kingdoms | 2007 | The Creative Assembly | Sega |
| The Medium | 2021 | Bloober Team | Bloober Team SA |
| Meet the Robinsons | 2007 | Buena Vista Games | Disney Interactive Studios |
| Mega Man 11 | 2018 | Capcom | Capcom |
| Mega Man Legends | 1997 | Capcom Production Studio 2 | Capcom Entertainment, Inc. |
| Mega Man Legends 2 | 2000 | Capcom Production Studio 2 | Capcom Entertainment, Inc. |
| Mega Man Maker | 2017 | Mega Man Maker Team | Mega Man Maker Team |
| Mega Man X Collection | 2018 | Capcom | Capcom |
| Mega Man X4 | 1997 | Capcom | Capcom |
| Mega Man X5 | 2000 | Capcom Production Studio 3 | Capcom |
| Mega Man X6 | 2001 | Capcom Production Studio 3 | Capcom |
| Mega Man X7 | 2003 | Capcom Production Studio 3 | Capcom |
| Mega Man X8 | 2005 | Capcom Production Studio 1 | Capcom |
| MegaRace 3 | 2001 | Cryo Interactive | Cryo Interactive |
| Megaton Rainfall | 2017 | Pentadimensional Games | Pentadimensional Games |
| Men of Valor | 2004 | 2015 | Vivendi Universal |
| Men of War | 2009 | Best Way | 1C Company |
| Mercenaries 2: World in Flames | 2008 | Pandemic Studios | Electronic Arts |
| Merchant Prince II | 2001 | Holistic Design, Inc. | TalonSoft |
| Meridian 59 | 1996 | Archetype Interactive, Near Death Studios | 3DO, Near Death Studios |
| The Messenger | 2001 | Canal+ Multimedia, Index+ | DreamCatcher Interactive, Microids |
| The Messenger | 2018 | Sabotage Studio | Devolver Digital |
| Messiah | 2000 | Shiny Entertainment | Interplay Entertainment |
| Metal Fatigue | 2000 | Zono | Psygnosis |
| Metal Gear Rising: Revengeance | 2013 | PlatinumGames | Konami |
| Metal Gear Solid | 2000 | Konami, Digital Dialect | Microsoft Games |
| Metal Gear Solid 2: Sons of Liberty | 2003 | Konami, Success | Konami |
| Metallic Child | 2021 | Studio HG | HIKE |
| Metamorphosis | 2020 | Ovid Works | All in! Games SA |
| Metro 2033 | 2010 | 4A Games | THQ |
| Metro Exodus | 2019 | 4A Games | Deep Silver |
| Metro: Last Light | 2013 | 4A Games | Deep Silver |
| Mia's Language Adventure: The Kidnap Caper | 2003 | Kutoka Interactive | Kutoka Interactive |
| Mia's Math Adventure: Just in Time! | 2001 | Kutoka Interactive | Kutoka Interactive |
| Mia's Reading Adventure: The Bugaboo Bugs | 2007 | Kutoka Interactive | Kutoka Interactive |
| Mia's Science Adventure: Romaine's New Hat | 2000 | Kutoka Interactive | Kutoka Interactive |
| Miasmata | 2012 | IonFX | IonFX Studios |
| Michael Schumacher Racing World Kart 2002 | 2002 | Radon Labs | JoWooD Productions |
| Michelin Rally Masters: Race of Champions | 2000 | Digital Illusions CE | Infogrames |
| Micro Commandos | 2002 | Monte Cristo | Monte Cristo |
| Micro Machines V3 | 1997 | Codemasters | Codemasters, Midway Games |
| Microshaft Winblows 98 | 1998 | Parroty Interactive | Palladium Interactive |
| Microsoft Baseball 2000 | 1999 | WizBang! Software Productions | Microsoft |
| Microsoft Baseball 2001 | 2000 | Microsoft | Microsoft |
| Microsoft Baseball 3D 1998 Edition | 1998 | WizBang! Software Productions | Microsoft |
| Microsoft Entertainment Pack: The Puzzle Collection | 1997 | Mir - Dialogue | Microsoft Games |
| Microsoft Flight Simulator | 2020 | Asobo Studio | Xbox Game Studios |
| Microsoft Flight Simulator for Windows 95 | 1996 | Microsoft | Microsoft |
| Microsoft Flight Simulator 98 | 1997 | Microsoft | Microsoft |
| Microsoft Flight Simulator 2000 | 1999 | Microsoft | Microsoft |
| Microsoft Flight Simulator 2002 | 2001 | Microsoft | Microsoft |
| Microsoft Flight Simulator 2004: A Century of Flight | 2003 | Microsoft | Microsoft |
| Microsoft Flight Simulator X | 2006 | ACES Studios | Microsoft |
| Microsoft Golf 1998 Edition | 1998 | Friendly Software | Microsoft |
| Microsoft Golf 1999 Edition | 1998 | Friendly Software | Microsoft |
| Microsoft Golf 2001 Edition | 2000 | Microsoft | Microsoft |
| Microsoft International Soccer 2000 | 1999 | Rage Software | Microsoft Studios |
| Microsoft Mahjong | 2012 | Arkadium | Microsoft Studios |
| Microsoft Solitaire Collection | 2012 | Arkadium | Microsoft Studios |
| Microsoft Pinball Arcade | 1998 | Microsoft | Microsoft |
| Microsoft Train Simulator | 2001 | MSTS 1: Kuju Entertainment | Microsoft |
| Middle-earth: Shadow of Mordor | 2014 | Monolith Productions | Warner Bros. Interactive Entertainment |
| Middle-earth: Shadow of War | 2017 | Monolith Productions | Warner Bros. Interactive Entertainment |
| Midnight Club II | 2003 | Rockstar San Diego | Rockstar Games |
| Midnight Rescue! | 1995 | The Learning Company | The Learning Company |
| Midtown Madness | 1999 | Angel Studios | Microsoft |
| Midtown Madness 2 | 2000 | Angel Studios | Microsoft Game Studios |
| Midway Arcade Treasures | 2003 | Digital Eclipse, Backbone Entertainment | Midway Games |
| Midway Arcade Treasures Deluxe Edition | 2006 | Midway Games | Midway Games |
| MiG Alley | 1999 | Rowan Software | Empire Interactive |
| MiG-29 Fulcrum | 1998 | NovaLogic | NovaLogic |
| Might & Magic Heroes VI | 2011 | Black Hole Entertainment | Ubisoft |
| Might & Magic Heroes VII | 2015 | Limbic Entertainment | Ubisoft |
| Might and Magic IX | 2002 | New World Computing | 3DO |
| Might and Magic VI: The Mandate of Heaven | 1998 | New World Computing | 3DO |
| Might and Magic VII: For Blood and Honor | 1999 | New World Computing | 3DO |
| Might and Magic VIII: Day of the Destroyer | 2000 | New World Computing | 3DO |
| Might & Magic X: Legacy | 2014 | Limbic Entertainment | Ubisoft |
| Mighty No. 9 | 2016 | Comcept | Deep Silver |
| Milky Way Prince: The Vampire Star | 2020 | Eyeguys | Santa Ragione |
| Millennium Soldier: Expendable | 1998 | Rage Software | Imagineer, Infogrames |
| MindRover | 2000 | CogniToy | CogniToy |
| Minecraft | 2011 | Mojang | Mojang |
| Minerva | 2005 | Adam Foster | Adam Foster |
| Mini Desktop Racing | 2005 | Data Design Interactive | Metro3D |
| Mini Ninjas | 2009 | IO Interactive | Eidos Interactive |
| Minions of Mirth | 2005 | Prairie Games, Inc. | Prairie Games, Inc. |
| Mirror's Edge | 2008 | EA Digital Illusions CE | Electronic Arts |
| Mirror's Edge Catalyst | 2016 | EA Digital Illusions CE | Electronic Arts |
| MirrorMoon EP | 2013 | Santa Ragione | Santa Ragione |
| Missed Messages | 2019 | Angela He | Angela He |
| Missile Command | 1999 | Meyer/Glass Interactive | Hasbro Interactive |
| Mission: T.H.I.N.K. | 1999 | The Learning Company | The Learning Company |
| MissionForce: CyberStorm | 1996 | Dynamix | Sierra Entertainment |
| MLB Front Office Manager | 2009 | Blue Castle Games | 2K Sports |
| Mob Enforcer | 2004 | Touchdown Entertainment | ValuSoft |
| Mobil 1 Rally Championship | 1999 | Magnetic Fields, Creative Asylum Limited | Actualize |
| Mobile Forces | 2002 | Rage Software | Majesco, Sold Out Software |
| Mobility | 2001 | Glamus | Glamus |
| The Moment of Silence | 2004 | House of Tales | Digital Jesters |
| Monato Esprit | 2009 | Gamasoft | Reality Gap, IT Territory |
| Monopoly | 1995 | Westwood Studios | Hasbro Interactive |
| Monopoly (2000 video game) | 2000 | Artech Studios | Hasbro Interactive |
| Monopoly Star Wars | 1997 | Artech Digital Entertainment | Hasbro Interactive |
| Monopoly Tycoon | 2001 | Deep Red Games | Infogrames |
| Monster Hunter Frontier Online | 2007 | Capcom | Capcom |
| Monster Madness: Battle for Suburbia | 2007 | Artificial Studios | SouthPeak Games |
| Monster Truck Madness | 1996 | Terminal Reality | Microsoft |
| Monster Truck Madness 2 | 1998 | Terminal Reality | Microsoft Games |
| Monsters vs. Aliens | 2009 | Beenox | Activision |
| Monsters, Inc. Scream Team | 2002 | Artificial Mind and Movement | Disney Interactive |
| Montezuma's Return! | 1997 | Utopia Technologies | Software 2000, WizardWorks |
| Monty Python & the Quest for the Holy Grail | 1996 | 7th Level | 7th Level |
| Moon Tycoon | 2001 | Legacy Interactive | Anarchy Enterprises |
| MoonBaseOne | 2007 | WeCreateGames Studios | Federation of Galaxy Explorers |
| Morning's Wrath | 2005 | Ethereal Darkness Interactive | Ethereal Darkness Interactive |
| Morpheus | 1998 | Soap Bubble Productions | Piranha Interactive Publishing, Tiburon Interactive Publishing |
| Mortal Kombat | 2013 | NetherRealm Studios, High Voltage Software | Warner Bros. Interactive Entertainment |
| Mortal Kombat 1 | 2023 | NetherRealm Studios, QLOC | Warner Bros. Games |
| Mortal Kombat 11 | 2019 | NetherRealm Studios, QLOC | Warner Bros. Interactive Entertainment |
| Mortal Kombat 3 | 1996 | Midway Games | GT Interactive |
| Mortal Kombat 4 | 1998 | Midway Games, Eurocom | Midway Games |
| Mortal Kombat Trilogy | 1997 | Point of View | GT Interactive |
| Mortal Kombat X | 2015 | NetherRealm Studios, High Voltage Software, QLOC | Warner Bros. Interactive Entertainment |
| Mortal Online | 2009 | Star Vault | Star Vault |
| Mortal Shell | 2020 | Cold Symmetry | Playstack |
| The Mortuary Assistant | 2022 | DarkStone Digital | DreadXP |
| Mosby's Confederacy | 2008 | Tilted Mill Entertainment | Tilted Mill Entertainment |
| Moto Racer | 1997 | Delphine Software International | Electronic Arts |
| Moto Racer 2 | 1998 | Delphine Software International | Delphine Software International/Electronic Arts |
| Motocross Madness 2 | 2000 | Rainbow Studios | Microsoft Games |
| MotoGP '07 | 2007 | Milestone srl | Milestone srl |
| MotoGP '08 | 2008 | Milestone srl | Milestone srl |
| MotoGP 13 | 2013 | Milestone srl | Milestone srl |
| MotoGP 14 | 2014 | Milestone srl | Milestone srl |
| MotoGP 15 | 2015 | Milestone srl | Milestone srl |
| MotoGP 17 | 2017 | Milestone srl | Milestone srl |
| MotoGP 18 | 2018 | Milestone srl | Milestone srl |
| MotoGP 20 | 2020 | Milestone srl | Milestone srl |
| Motor City Online | 2001 | Electronic Arts | Electronic Arts |
| Motorhead | 1999 | Digital Illusions CE | Gremlin Interactive, Fox Interactive |
| Mount & Blade | 2008 | TaleWorlds | Paradox Interactive |
| Mount & Blade II: Bannerlord | 2022 | TaleWorlds Entertainment | TaleWorlds Entertainment, Prime Matter |
| Mount & Blade: Warband | 2010 | TaleWorlds | Paradox Interactive |
| Mountain of Faith | 2007 | Team Shanghai Alice | Team Shanghai Alice |
| Movie Battles | 2009 | Movie Battles Team | Movie Battles Team |
| The Movies | 2005 | Lionhead Studios | Activision |
| Moving Out | 2020 | SMG Studio, DevM Games | Team17 |
| Moving Out 2 | 2023 | SMG Studio, DevM Games | Team17 |
| Mr. Robot | 2007 | Moonpod | Moonpod |
| Ms. Pac-Man: Quest for the Golden Maze | 2001 | Namco | Infogrames |
| Mu Online | 2003 | Webzen | Webzen |
| MudRunner | 2017 | Saber Interactive | Focus Home Interactive |
| Multi Theft Auto | 2005 | MTA Team | MTA Team |
| Multiwinia | 2008 | Introversion Software | Introversion Software |
| Muppet Kids | 1997 | Jim Henson Interactive | Brighter Child |
| Muppets Inside | 1996 | Starwave | Starwave |
| Murder House | 2020 | Puppet Combo | Puppet Combo |
| Murdered: Soul Suspect | 2014 | Airtight Games, Square Enix Extreme Edges Team | Square Enix |
| Music 2000 | 1999 | Jester Interactive | Codemasters |
| Music Catch | 2008 | Reflexive Entertainment | Reflexive Entertainment |
| My Animal Centre in Africa | 2006 | Braingame | Europress |
| My Disney Kitchen | 2002 | Atlus | Disney Interactive |
| My Friendly Neighborhood | 2023 | John and Evan Szymanski | DreadXP |
| My Horse & Me | 2007 | W!Games | Atari |
| MySims | 2007 | EA Redwood Shores | Electronic Arts |
| Myst | 1994 | Cyan Worlds | Broderbund, Red Orb Entertainment |
| Myst III: Exile | 2001 | Presto Studios | Ubisoft, Cyan Worlds |
| Myst IV: Revelation | 2004 | Ubisoft Montreal | Ubisoft, Cyan Worlds |
| Myst Online: Uru Live | 2007 | Cyan Worlds | Ubisoft, Cyan Worlds, GameTap |
| Myst V: End of Ages | 2005 | Cyan Worlds | Ubisoft |
| Mysterious Journey II | 2003 | Detalion | The Adventure Company |
| The Mystery of the Druids | 2001 | House of Tales Entertainment | Cdv Software Entertainment |
| Mystery P.I.: The Lottery Ticket | 2007 | SpinTop Games | PopCap Games |
| Myth: The Fallen Lords | 1997 | Bungie | Bungie, Eidos Interactive |
| Myth II: Soulblighter | 1998 | Bungie | Bungie, GT Interactive |
| Myth III: The Wolf Age | 2001 | MumboJumbo | Take-Two Interactive, Gathering of Developers |
| Mytheon | 2011 | Petroglyph Games | True Games |
