= Monster Truck Madness =

1996 racing video game

- Developer: Terminal Reality
- Publisher: Microsoft
- Designers: Joseph Selinske; Gaither Simmons
- Programmers: Richard Harvey; Robert Minnis; Mark Randel; Greg Seehusen
- Artists: Chuck Carson; Drew Haworth; Terry Simmons
- Composers: Kyle Richards; Tom Wedge
- Engine: Photex
- Platform: Microsoft Windows
- Release: NA: September 9, 1996; (Note: GameSpot cites an August 31, 1996 release date for Monster Truck Madness, but Online Gaming Review mentions the game as being released on September 9, 1996 (and/or September 10, 1996) instead.)
- Genre: Racing
- Modes: Single-player, multiplayer

Monster Truck Madness is a racing video game developed by Terminal Reality and published by Microsoft. It was released in North America on September 9, 1996. The game has twelve monster trucks and tasks the player with beating computer opponents. Checkpoints, multiple hidden shortcuts, and interactable objects commonly appear in the tracks. In the garage, the player modifies the truck to account for terrain surfaces. Online multiplayer is accessed with a modem, a local area network (LAN), or TCP/IP.

Terminal Reality designed Monster Truck Madness to accurately simulate monster truck events and replicate the titular off-road vehicles. The developer hired announcer Armey Armstrong to perform sports commentary. Monster Truck Madness received a massive following, and video game publications generally praised its gameplay, graphics, and physics. It is the first entry in Microsoft's Madness series of racing titles, which included Motocross Madness and Midtown Madness. Monster Truck Madness was followed by a sequel, Monster Truck Madness 2. Terminal Reality developed another off-road truck racing game, 4x4 Evo.

== Gameplay ==
The player driving Bigfoot on A Crazy Eight.

Monster Truck Madness offers twelve monster trucks, including Bigfoot, Grave Digger and Snake Bite, (Note: The other monster trucks are Bear Foot, Boogey Van, Carolina Crusher, Monster Patrol, Overkill, Power Wheels, Rampage, Samson, and Wildfoot.) and tasks the player with beating computer opponents in four single-player modes: Drag, Circuit, Rally, and Tournament. Drag focuses on traditional monster truck events set in arena and stadium venues like BC Place and Tacoma Dome; the player qualifies to participate in knockout races that involve jumping over rows of cars. Circuit has five short race tracks, and Rally has long exotic tracks themed after Arizona, the highlands, and the Yucatán. In Tournament, the player participates in a custom series of events with computer opponents. Checkpoints, multiple hidden shortcuts (like a broken bridge), and objects (such as cacti, road signs, and fences) commonly appear in the tracks. The finder directs the truck towards the checkpoint and can call the helicopter to put the truck back on the road.

In the garage, the player modifies the truck's tires, suspension, and acceleration-to-speed ratio to account for terrain surfaces such as mud and grass. The player can compete in multiplayer using DirectPlay and with a modem, LAN, or TCP/IP. The game includes multiple camera angles like blimp and cockpit, as well as the ability to watch and save replays of the events.

== Development and release ==
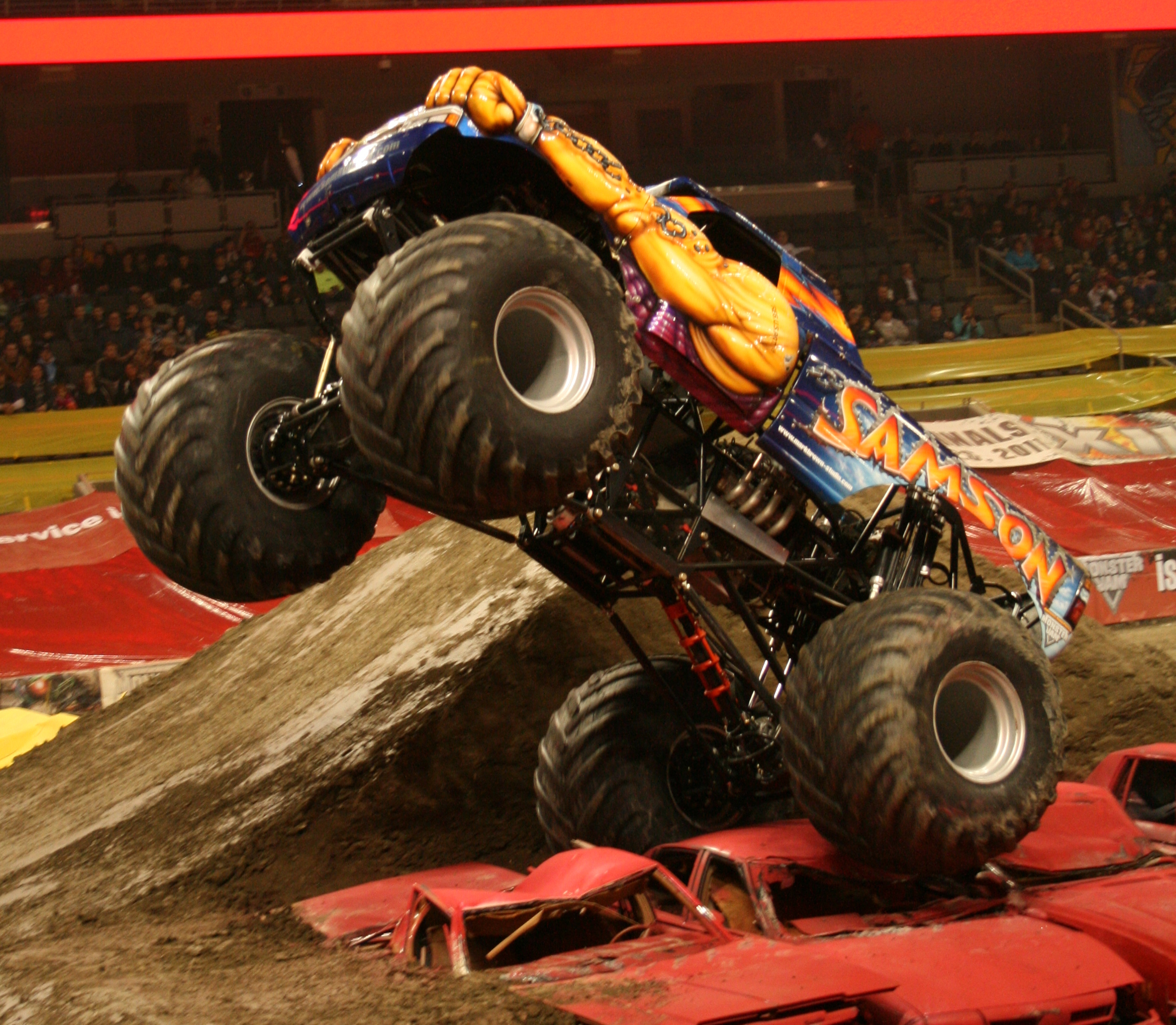
Samson (pictured in the 2011 Monster Jam event) is one of the twelve monster trucks in Monster Truck Madness.

American video game studio Terminal Reality, Inc. (TRI) developed a 1995 alien-themed combat flight simulation game named Terminal Velocity. It was published by game distributor 3D Realms for MS-DOS as three episodes, with the first of them being offered as shareware. The studio subsequently started to make games for software publisher Microsoft, the first two being Fury³ and Hellbender. Both products received mixed reviews for their similarities to Terminal Velocity and Wing Commander III: Heart of the Tiger. Terminal Reality created an unreleased 1995 MS-DOS product titled Heavy Metal Truck (codenamed Metal Crush), but in 1996 they renamed it to Monster Truck Madness and developed it for Windows 95.

They designed it to accurately simulate monster truck events such as drag tracks and enclosed circuit races, and replicate the titular off-road vehicles on land, when jumping, and during collisions. The trucks' sound effects were recorded and digitized from such races. The game's twelve monster trucks were used under license from companies like Bigfoot 4×4, Inc., the owner of Bigfoot and Snake Bite. The developer hired announcer Armey Armstrong (Note: Armey Armstrong is listed as "Army Armstrong" in the credits.) to perform sports commentary, resulting in lines such as "Bigfoot is doing it in the air!" and "when it's going your way, it's going your way".

On May 16, the game was displayed at the 1996 Electronic Entertainment Expo (E3), and Microsoft announced its autumn release date. It was released in North America during the August 31-September 9 period. Monster Truck Madness was one of the first titles to provide force feedback and Direct3D support and required a video card for smooth, quickly processed graphics. It even included an online manual and full motion videos (FMVs) of monster truck events. TRI distributed through its website a freely downloadable program titled Track Editor Version 1.0 for users to create custom races for the game, but they were surprised by popular demand for a truck editor, so they included that in Monster Truck & Track Editor Version 1.1. They also released a "POD management program" named Podman.

== Reception ==
=== Sales ===
Monster Truck Madness was a commercial success, accumulating a worldwide following. The game peaked at number 10 on PC Data's PC games sales charts during October, subsequently dropping to number 18 for November. It debuted at number 73 at NPD Group's Top Entertainment Titles chart in September, reaching number 13 in October. The game sold 144,000 copies in the U.S in the first six months.

=== Critical reviews ===
Reception

Aggregate score
Aggregator	Score
GameRankings	77%

Review scores
Publication	Score
Computer Gaming World	Positive
GameSpot	7.4/10
Next Generation	4/5
PC Gamer (US)	85/100
PC Zone	78%
Game Briefs	Positive
Game Revolution	B+
PC Games	B-

Surprisingly, this game is honestly one of the prettiest things to appear on the PC screen for quite some time.

— Jason C. Carnevale of Game Revolution on the graphics of Monster Truck Madness.

Monster Truck Madness received mainly positive reviews in printed and online video game publications. Jeff Lundrigan, a review editor for Next Generation, praised the game being able to manipulate the capabilities of Windows 95, since it can achieve high frame rates without 3D graphics accelerator cards. He was entertained by the game's physics model but saw it as unrealistic, citing an example of a monster truck jumping almost 100 feet above a hill. While GameSpot's Rebecca Anderson perceived monster truck racing as immature, she enjoyed playing the game and praised Armstrong's commentary. However, she spotted visual glitches appearing near static objects. The game's official website quoted a review from Bernard Dy of the website Game Briefs who called it one of the greatest Windows 95 games, viewing its graphics as similar to Papyrus Design's NASCAR Racing and adding the physics were "designed for fun". Although he cautioned that players expecting realism would be disappointed at the lack of a printed manual and an absent damage model, he felt its sound design and online manual benefited the game. The three reviewers considered the significant number of customizable performance variables to befit all "skill level[s]". PC Zone likened the game to a hybrid of Stunt Car Racer and NASCAR Racing.

Writing for Computer Gaming World, M. Clarkson commented that the game emphasizes simplicity over detail, and added that players would be amused by the trucks jumping in the air and traversing the mud. Jason C. Carnevale of Game Revolution was surprised at the game's graphical quality, saying driving through the circuits is visually pleasant with billboards, stands, automobiles, barbeque pits, and Winnebagos. He viewed the controls as comfortable and appreciated the game's multiple shortcuts. Carnevale recommended Monster Truck Madness for players desiring a short, exciting game. Reviewing the game for PC Gamer, Colin Williamson was enthused over the design of the trucks and enjoyed its gameplay, but criticized Armstrong's work and felt more tracks would be a good idea. He said the tracks are sizeable and diverse and favored the Rally races for their openness. Williamson felt that Microsoft had minimized the realism to lessen the game's difficulty. Rob Smith of PC Games commented on the trucks' slowness and noticed that their big tires allow them to bounce when "stray[ing] from the beaten track". According to Smith, auto-shift and auto-braking "on corners" assist players well. He was impressed that up to eight players can participate in the game's online multiplayer mode. Smith's summary noted the game lacked originality but provided a solid arcade-style racing experience. Monster Truck Madness was nominated for Computer Games Strategy Plus' 1996 Racing Simulation of the Year award, but lost to NASCAR Racing 2.

== Legacy ==
Monster Truck Madness is the first entry in the Madness series of racing titles distributed by Microsoft. Terminal Reality developed the game's 1998 sequel, Monster Truck Madness 2; it features more trucks and tracks and uses the Photex2 game engine for improved graphics and physics. Microsoft subsequently published the motocross-centered Motocross Madness in 1998, and the open world Chicago-themed Midtown Madness in 1999, both of which also received sequels. In collaboration with Microsoft, THQ and Tantalus Media created a 2003 Game Boy Advance game dubbed Monster Truck Madness, sporting 2.5D graphics, powerups, and time trial mode. GameSpot named it the best Game Boy Advance game of August 2003.

Terminal Reality made a 1997 game titled CART Precision Racing, which features gameplay simulating Indy car racing. They subsequently developed another off-road truck racing game, 4x4 Evo. In its Career Mode, the player participates in races to earn money for purchasing trucks. Its sequel 4x4 Evo 2 introduced Adventure Mission mode, where the player performs treasure hunts and rescue operations to obtain additional money.
