= Edge of Reality =

American video game developer

- Type: Private
- Industry: Video games
- Founded: 1998
- Defunct: 2018
- Headquarters: Austin, Texas, US
- Key people: Binu Philip (President); Rob Cohen (CEO, co-founder); Mike Panoff (VP, co-founder)
- Website: Edge of Reality (archived, down since Nov. 2018)

Edge of Reality, Ltd. was an American video game developer, founded in 1998 and based in Austin, Texas, that wrote games for the Nintendo 64, GameCube, PlayStation 2, Xbox, PlayStation 3, and Xbox 360 consoles. The company developed the Nintendo 64 ports of the first three Tony Hawk's games. There were two development teams: one worked on licenses and established franchises, while the other worked on original games. The company developed two games at a time, one with each team. Edge of Reality closed in 2018.

== History ==
Edge of Reality was founded in 1998 by Rob Cohen, the lead programmer of Turok: Dinosaur Hunter at Iguana Entertainment and Mike Panoff from Paradigm Entertainment. The company initially received funding from Gathering of Developers, who was intending to publish its video games. The company initially started off by developing an original game 4x4 Mud Monsters, which was retooled into a licensed version of Monster Truck Madness.

The company started by developing Nintendo 64 ports of successful games on other systems, including the Tony Hawk's Pro Skater series. The company's first title, Monster Truck Madness 64, was released later by Rockstar Games. The company's success later gained the attention of Activision, by developing a Nintendo 64 adaptation of the PlayStation hit Tony Hawk's Pro Skater, establishing a long-term relationship.

The company then got the attention by developing games for the Nintendo GameCube. Following the stability provided by the success of the ports, the company then branched out into developing its own original games on multiple platforms, including Pitfall: The Lost Expedition and Loadout, the latter was its only self-published title.

== Games developed ==
Year	Game	Publisher	Platform(s)
2004	Pitfall: The Lost Expedition	Activision	Game Boy Advance, GameCube, PlayStation 2, Wii, Windows, Xbox
2004	Shark Tale	Activision	GameCube, PlayStation 2, Windows, Xbox
2006	Over the Hedge	Activision	GameCube, PlayStation 2, Windows, Xbox
2008	The Incredible Hulk	Sega	PlayStation 2, PlayStation 3, Wii, Windows, Xbox 360
2014	Loadout	Self-published	Windows, Xbox One
2014	Transformers: Rise of the Dark Spark	Activision	PlayStation 3, PlayStation 4, Wii U, Windows, Xbox 360, Xbox One
Cancelled	Fear and Respect	Midway	PlayStation 2, Xbox, Xbox 360
Cancelled	Cipher Complex	Sega	Wii U, Windows, Xbox 360

== Ports ==
Year	Title	Platforms
1999	Monster Truck Madness 64	Nintendo 64
2000	Spider-Man	Nintendo 64
2000	Tony Hawk's Pro Skater	Nintendo 64
2001	Tony Hawk's Pro Skater 2	Nintendo 64
2002	Tony Hawk's Pro Skater 3	Nintendo 64
2003	The Sims	GameCube, PlayStation 2, Xbox
2009	Dragon Age: Origins	PlayStation 3, Xbox 360
2010	The Sims 3	PlayStation 3, Xbox 360
2011	The Sims 3: Pets	PlayStation 3, Xbox 360
2012	Mass Effect	PlayStation 3
