= Vestra =

Vestra may refer to the following:

- Vestra, a village in Vindafjord Municipality, Norway
- Vestra, a tradename of reboxetine
- Vestra, a district of Vantaa, Finland
- one of the outposts in the fictional universe of the game Fury3
- Vestra, a Latin word meaning "your" (possessive)
