= Magnant =

Magnant can refer to:

- Magnant, Aube, commune in the Aube department in north-central France.
- Magnant (video game), an RTS game by American studio Mohydine Entertainment
