= Lottery ticket (disambiguation) =

A lottery is a form of gambling where players bet receipts are known as "tickets".

Lottery ticket may also refer to:

- Lottery Ticket (1970 film), an Indian film
- Lottery Ticket (1982 film), an Indian Tamil-language film
- Lottery Ticket (2010 film), a US film
- The Lottery Ticket, an 1886 Jules Verne adventure novel

== See also ==
- Mystery P.I.: The Lottery Ticket, a hidden object game
- The Lottery Ticket Seller, a 1953 Mexican film
