= Monster Truck Madness 2 =

1998 video game

- Developers: Terminal Reality (PC); Edge of Reality (N64)
- Publishers: Microsoft (PC); Rockstar Games (N64)
- Programmers: Mark Randel; Greg Seehusen
- Artists: Kate Bigel; Kiki Wolfkill; Chuck Carson
- Composers: Kyle Richards; Tom Wedge
- Engine: Photex2/Terrain5
- Platforms: Microsoft Windows; Nintendo 64
- Release: Windows: NA: May 13, 1998; Nintendo 64: NA: July 30, 1999; EU: October 29, 1999
- Genre: Racing
- Modes: Single-player, multiplayer

Monster Truck Madness 2 (Note: During development, it was referred to by its internal codename Metal Crush 2.) is a monster truck racing video game developed by Terminal Reality and published by Microsoft for the PC (Windows 95/NT) in 1998. It is the sequel to Monster Truck Madness for the same platform, and was one of the first racing games to feature an online multiplayer mode. Online play for it was available on the MSN Gaming Zone until early 2006.

The game was ported to the Nintendo 64 in 1999 by Edge of Reality. It was co-published with Rockstar Games and released as Monster Truck Madness 64. The game is known for featuring popular monster trucks like Bigfoot, Grave Digger and Carolina Crusher, as well as WrestleTrucks —monster trucks named after WCW talent.

== Overview ==
Monster Truck Madness 2 features licensed monster trucks such as Grave Digger, shown here on "The Heights" track.

This sequel offers improved graphics, an updated interface, new trucks and tracks and the addition of variable weather conditions when compared to its predecessor. The game is known for featuring the biggest names in monster truck racing like Bigfoot, Grave Digger and Carolina Crusher, as well as WrestleTrucks —monster trucks named after WCW talent. It was one of the first racing games to feature an online multiplayer mode. However, the game engine is essentially the same, and most custom trucks and tracks are compatible with both games. The game contains assets from older Terminal Reality games, like Hellbender and CART Precision Racing.

The "Summit Rumble" king of the hill tracks could only be played if the player intended to compete online. Again, "Army" Armstrong provides commentary for the game. However, his race calls have been updated, and new ones have been added. Just like its predecessor, it contains an inaccessible truck, "Chuck's Car" (a Chevrolet Camaro). It was intended to be unlocked by typing in "CHUCK" in a race. The game still displays this message when typed: "Restart the game to drive Chuck's Car". If one restarts the game, it is not there.

The Microsoft Sidewinder Force Feedback wheel's installation CD also contains the game. The game's file mounting systems gives the possibility to add (or remove) custom tracks and trucks to the game using different editors.

== Development and release ==
Monster Truck Madness was released on August 31, 1996, and is the first entry in the Madness series of racing titles distributed by Microsoft. American video game studio Terminal Reality, Inc. designed Monster Truck Madness to accurately simulate monster truck events such as drag tracks and enclosed circuit races, and replicate the titular off-road vehicles on land, when jumping, and during collisions. Sound effects of the trucks were recorded and digitized from such races. The game's twelve monster trucks were used under license from companies like Bigfoot 4×4, Inc., the owner of Bigfoot and Snake Bite. The developer hired announcer Army Armstrong to perform sports commentary, resulting in lines such as "Bigfoot is doing it in the air!" and "when it's going your way, it's going your way". Terminal Reality developed Monster Truck Madness 2 as a sequel to the original which features more trucks and tracks. The game features licensed WCW-themed WrestleTrucks and uses the Photex2 game engine for improved graphics and physics. It was released in North America on May 13, 1998, as a Windows title.

=== Monster Truck Madness 64 ===
Monster Truck Madness 64 is a Nintendo 64 port of Monster Truck Madness 2 developed by Edge of Reality and published by Rockstar Games. It was released in 1999. It received advertisement time on World Championship Wrestling programming and features trucks styled after WCW wrestlers. In addition, one commercial spot featured WCW wrestler Kevin Nash.

== Reception ==
Reception

Aggregate score
Aggregator	Score	
Aggregator	N64	PC
GameRankings	51%	76%

Review scores
Publication	Score	
Publication	N64	PC
CNET Gamecenter	4/10	8/10
Computer Games Strategy Plus	N/A	3/5
Computer Gaming World	N/A	3.5/5
Electronic Gaming Monthly	5.25/10 (Note: Two critics of Electronic Gaming Monthly gave the Nintendo 64 version each a score of 5/10, one gave it 4.5/10, and the other gave it 6.5/10.)	N/A
Game Informer	5.5/10	N/A
GameFan	57%	N/A
GameRevolution	N/A	B+
GameSpot	3.9/10	7.4/10
IGN	7.1/10	N/A
N64 Magazine	66%	N/A
Next Generation	1/5	3/5
Nintendo Power	6/10	N/A
PC Accelerator	N/A	6/10
PC Gamer (US)	N/A	85%
The Cincinnati Enquirer	N/A	3/5

Monster Truck Madness 2 received favorable reviews, while Monster Truck Madness 64 received "mixed" reviews, according to the review aggregation website GameRankings.

GameSpot said of the PC version, "The designers wisely recognized that the subtlety of monster truck racing cried out for the added nuance that only a professional wrestling tie-in could bestow." GamePro said of the same PC version, "If you're a monster masher yearning for "Sunday! Sunday! SUNDAY!" Monster Truck Madness 2 is your brew." (Note: GamePro gave the PC version two 4/5 scores for graphics and fun factor, 3.5/5 for sound, and 4.5/5 for control.) An unnamed reviewer of Next Generation's August 1998 issue called the same PC version "a definite improvement." Fifteen issues later, however, Doug Trueman of the same magazine (now labeled NextGen) said of Monster Truck Madness 64, "If you want intense off-road racing, play EA's Beetle Adventure Racing instead and run this title over with your car." Adam Roff of Hyper gave the latter 68%, calling it "a lack-lustre conversion of what was a decent PC title. It isn't racing and it isn't wrestling and it isn't fun." Scott Alan Marriott of AllGame gave the same console version two-and-a-half stars out of five, saying, "Monster Truck Madness offers almost everything you'd expect from an Arcade racer except for tight control; the developers decided to make these trucks extremely hard to keep on the road, which ultimately destroys the atmosphere of the game."
