= Mick Brown (angler) =

British fisherman

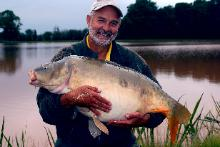
- Brown with a specimen carp.
- Born: Michael Brown; 1946 (age 79–80); Birmingham, England
- Occupation: Angler
- Years active: 1976–present
- Spouse: Janet Brown
- Children: 2

Michael Brown (born 1946) is a British angler who co-hosts several fishing programs with Matt Hayes on Discovery Real Time (channel). He has starred in over 80 programs. He is best known for his love of targeting predator fish, especially pike.

Brown has released many books on predator fishing and even has his own signature line of fishing rods.

He was born in Birmingham and lived with his parents, two brothers and a sister in the Acocks Green area of the city. He worked as an engineer at Lucas before making his break to be a professional angler in the 1980s. Now married to Jan, he is a father to Daniel, Nicola, Rhiannon, and Kay and has several grandchildren.

Brown is mainly known for accompanying Matt Hayes in programmes such as:

- Total Fishing 2006
- Record Breaking Fish
- The Great Rod Race
- The Greater Rod Race
- Wet Nets

He has appeared in over 80 angling programmes. He is also known for his own DVDs such as

- Mick Brown on Pike Fishing
- Mick Brown Summer Pike Fishing

Brown has also released books on Pike & Predator fishing such as Pike Fishing: The Practice and the Passion, and Mick Browns Guide to Pike and Predators.

Brown runs a YouTube channel MickBrownFishingTV.
