= Matt Hayes =

British angler (born 1961)

- Born: Matthew Hayes; 24 November 1961 (age 64); Smethwick, UK
- Occupation: Angler
- Spouse: Anne Marit Winsnes-Hayes
- Family: 5

Matthew Hayes is a British angler who is featured in televised angling shows on Discovery Real Time.

== Television ==
Hayes has appeared in several TV series alongside his fishing companion and fellow programme contributor Mick Brown. These include The Great Rod Race, The Greater Rod Race and Wet Nets. The first two are both about 30 day challenges from the west coast of Ireland, to the east coast of England.

Hayes also starred in the TV series Mainstream, in which he travelled down the UK's most famous rivers from 'source to sea', wetting a line or two along the way.

He also starred in 24 Hour Rod Race (Series 1 – June 2012) and 24 Hour Rod Race (Series 2 – October 2013) in which he has no companion. Both series involve episodes with Hayes being set a target which he must meet within 24 hours.

He also starred in the multi-series Total Fishing series.

== Books ==
Hayes wrote the books Coarse Fishing (1995) and My Red Letter Days (2015).

== Other work ==
Hayes endorsed the fishing video game Matt Hayes Fishing (2002).

He was a judge on the hit BBC 2 TV series The Earth's Wildest Waters and The Big Fish.

Hayes used to write a weekly column in the Angling Times, and serves as the President of The Carp Society.
