= RoadKill (video game) =

2003 video game

- Developer: Terminal Reality
- Publisher: Midway
- Engine: Infernal Engine
- Platforms: Xbox, PlayStation 2, GameCube
- Release: PlayStation 2, Xbox: NA: October 13, 2003; PAL: November 21, 2003; GameCube: NA: October 30, 2003
- Genre: Vehicular combat
- Modes: Single-player, multiplayer

RoadKill is an open world vehicular combat video game developed by Terminal Reality and published by Midway in 2003 for PlayStation 2, Xbox, and GameCube. The game was described by Midway as "the only mission-based combat driving game set in a post-apocalyptic world".

== Gameplay ==
RoadKill is a vehicular combat game, and its gameplay is very similar to Twisted Metal, with a mission-based storyline and open-world elements inspired by Grand Theft Auto III and Grand Theft Auto: Vice City. Like in Twisted Metal, the player controls an improvised combat vehicle, and in a similar fashion to Grand Theft Auto, the player performs a variety of missions to progress through the game's storyline, has an option for free-roam, and is able to commit certain actions to increase their criminal ranks, such as attacking rival gangs, destroying vehicles, and causing havoc.

The player starts with only one vehicle to choose from, though more vehicles can be unlocked as the game progresses, either by completing certain missions or by collecting "blueprints" scattered across the city. To fit the post-apocalyptic setting, most vehicles are heavily modified and armored classic muscle cars, SUVs, pickup trucks, and vans, all of which are armed with mounted machine guns. Additional weapons, such as rocket launchers, guided missiles, sniper rifles, and various explosives, can be obtained or purchased throughout the game with limited ammunition. In several missions, the player is required to control the turret gun to attack enemies whilst driven around.

The main goal of the game is to increase the criminal reputation of the player in the form of "ranks", which can be achieved by killing or attacking rival gangs, destroying vehicles, and street racing.

The game features three different cities. Each city has its own boss, whom the player engages in a one-on-one battle to unlock the next city and progress through the storyline. In order to confront the boss, the player must complete storyline missions and jobs given by other characters, most of whom are gang leaders. Storyline missions would also unlock various customizations, weapons and vehicles.

Upon completion of certain missions or side jobs, the player is able to purchase upgrades. Upgrades allow any vehicle to have its performance improved, increased ammunition capacity, or added armor for better protection against enemy attacks. Upgrades can be obtained by visiting shop garages in exchange for money.

As the game progresses, the player unlocks and obtains more weapons and vehicles. Unlocked vehicles can be accessed in the player's garage, and new weapons would spawn at various points in the city or in front of the garage. Vehicles come in two types: normal and gang-affiliated. Gang-affiliated cars are mostly distinguished by their brighter colors and appear to be more customized when compared to normal cars. Driving a gang-affiliated vehicle will cause a certain opposing gang to become hostile and attack the player on sight upon entering their territory; likewise, driving a law enforcement vehicle will cause all gangs to attack and attempt to kill the protagonist, making the game more challenging. Like other open-world games, the game features a "Riot" mechanic that determines the number of Sentinels (a gang masquerading as police) that chase the player in addition to increasing severity of their crimes. When the Riot level is at maximum, the player automatically enters a "Survival" mission, where the goal is to evade and survive attacks from the Sentinels until the player loses them or collects a peace sign.

== Plot ==
After a deadly disease known as "The Rot" causes the collapse of law and order, massive gangs form in every community and engage in constant warfare using weaponized vehicles. One such community is Hell County, United States, which is split into three cities: Lava Falls, Blister Canyon, and Paradise City.

In the aftermath of the chaos, a survivor named Mason Strong, a drifter who joined the Sentinels led by Axl who made Mason his second in command, the Sentinels proceeded to take over Paradise City and became its draconian leader with a bigger goal of eliminating the gangs in the other cities and enslaving survivors in the wastes. However, Axl was too greedy to share his newfound power and noticing Mason's increasing influence. Attempts to have Mason killed only for him to barely survive. Now out for revenge, he washes up on a beach outside Lava Falls and finds work for the Daredevils, a clown-themed punk gang composed of Scottish and British immigrants led by the psychotic pimp Uncle Woody. After being accused of snitching to a rival Hispanic gang called Gauchos, Mason ends up having to kill Woody and escape his amusement park.

The Gauchos open the way to Blister Canyon and Mason finds a new employer, the flamboyant Section Eights led by General Warwick, a former military officer along with his homosexual right-hand man Gunny. Mason helps Warwick and Gunny in their war against the Talons. After killing Drake, the Talons' head lieutenant, Mason participates in an operation to kill the Talon leader Gordon Grim, making his way through the sewers and into Paradise City to join the South League, a football-themed black gang. Mason fights their rivals, the Dreg Lords and rescues their leader, Knox, from the Sentinels who then orders Mason to launch an assault against the Dreg Lords.

With the Dreg Lords weakened, South League drives their full attention on to the Sentinels. To weaken their defenses, Mason delivers explosives to the Sentinels' territory, before destroying the generators that power Axl's propaganda broadcasts using bomb-planted RC cars. Axl starts to loses influence on the city and Mason heads to the city hall to confront Axl personally before engaging in a climactic battle, with Axl using a customized monster truck. Mason wins the battle and destroys Axl's vehicle. Axl survives the destruction and attempts to kill Mason, only to be run over by a bus. With Axl overthrown and the South League now in control of Paradise City, Mason hears a distress call from another faction of survivors, pleading for help when learning about his reputation for "setting things right". Mason then drives away from Paradise City to points unknown to assist them.

== Reception ==
Reception

Aggregate score
Aggregator	Score		
Aggregator	GameCube	PS2	Xbox
Metacritic	64/100	71/100	68/100

Review scores
Publication	Score		
Publication	GameCube	PS2	Xbox
Electronic Gaming Monthly	6.17/10	6.17/10	6.17/10
Game Informer	N/A	6/10	6.5/10
GamePro	N/A	4/5	N/A
GameRevolution	B−	B−	B−
GameSpot	7.6/10	7.6/10	7.6/10
GameSpy	N/A	2/5	1/5
GameZone	N/A	7.8/10	6.5/10
IGN	7.7/10	7.7/10	7.7/10
Nintendo Power	1.3/5	N/A	N/A
Official U.S. PlayStation Magazine	N/A	4/5	N/A
Official Xbox Magazine (US)	N/A	N/A	8.6/10
Maxim	4/10	4/10	4/10

The game received "mixed or average reviews" on all platforms according to the review aggregation website Metacritic.
