= SpyHunter: Nowhere to Run =

2006 action racing video game

- European PS2 cover art
- Developer: Terminal Reality
- Publisher: Midway Games
- Producer: John O'Keefe
- Designer: Clint Bogue
- Programmers: Chris Bream; Allen Bogue
- Artists: Grant Gosler; Adam Norton
- Composers: Kyle Richards; Cris Velasco; Sascha Dikiciyan
- Series: Spy Hunter
- Engine: Infernal Engine (PS2 & Xbox)
- Platforms: PlayStation 2, Xbox, Microsoft Windows
- Release: PlayStation 2: NA: September 5, 2006; EU: September 8, 2006; Xbox: NA: September 5, 2006; Windows: EU: March 26, 2009
- Genres: Action, Racing
- Mode: Single-player

SpyHunter: Nowhere to Run is a 2006 action racing video game developed by Terminal Reality and published by Midway Games for PlayStation 2 and Xbox. A version for Microsoft Windows was released in 2009 by Steel Monkeys. It is the first (and currently only) installment in the Spy Hunter series to allow the player to play as the character and not only the vehicle. Nowhere to Run was an orphaned tie-in to an unmade Spy Hunter movie adaptation. The film got stuck in development hell and the game was released as a stand-alone. The game stars Dwayne Johnson as government agent Alex Decker, who replaces Alec Sects, the "SpyHunter" who was to have been the main character of the movie.

== Plot ==
Alex Decker, an agent of the International Espionage Service, is transporting an unknown cargo when he is pursued by NOSTRA agents. After escaping the agents, he meets with Karin, another IES agent. Alex and Karin engage in a gun fight against NOSTRA agents. The shipment Alex was carrying is confiscated by Gomez, the NOSTRA leader. Alex's Interceptor performance car is confiscated, and Karin disappears.

A year later, Alex traces his Interceptor to a freighter offshore. With the help of another agent, he downloads codes to recover his car and steal the ship's cargo. As Decker escapes the ship, he is pursued by NOSTRA agents. After a long and arduous chase, Decker escapes the agents and reaches the IES base safely. The base is attacked by the NOSTRA agents, but the IES successfully defend the base. The director of the IES is taken hostage, and the IES launches a counterattack on the NOSTRA base. Upon rescuing the director, Alex pursues Olaf in a lengthy chase, and eventually meets him upon a NOSTRA train. Alex defeats him by throwing him out of the train. The damaged train reaches a secret NOSTRA base, where Alex finds and defeats Cyrus and Marduk.

Decker sneaks onto a NOSTRA plane and tries to fight Gomez, but Gomez escapes. Karin and Decker use an Interceptor to fly out of the plane and pursue Gomez. The fates of the three characters are not revealed.

== Reception ==
Reception

Aggregate score
Aggregator	Score	
Aggregator	PS2	Xbox
Metacritic	51/100	51/100

Review scores
Publication	Score	
Publication	PS2	Xbox
Game Informer	3/10	3/10
GameSpot	5.5/10	5.5/10
GameSpy	2/5	2/5
GameTrailers	6/10	6/10
GameZone	N/A	5.5/10
IGN	6/10	6/10
Official Xbox Magazine (US)	N/A	4/10
PALGN	4.5/10	N/A
PlayStation: The Official Magazine	5/10	N/A
X-Play	N/A	2/5
Detroit Free Press	2/4	2/4
The Times	3/5	N/A

The game received "mixed" reviews according to the review aggregation website Metacritic. It was praised for its script and acting, but highly criticized for its lack of power ups and uninspiring gameplay when outside of a vehicle.

The Times gave the PlayStation 2 version a score of three stars out of five and said that with The Rock in the game, "Midway has got carried away with the cinematic feel of the venture at the expense of gameplay. This is a shame, because in between the fancy film work, a very good game breaks out." However, Detroit Free Press gave the game two stars out of four, saying that "The road [in this game] is too rocky to be a keeper. It's a one-night rental -- tops." Chris McCarver of 411Mania gave the PS2 version 3.5 out of 10, saying, "While I understand Midway and developer Terminal Reality's need to showcase The Rock and his action-star status for the sake of this game, Spy Hunter: Nowhere to Run takes the franchise into entirely new and, sadly, entirely unwanted territory. Even with the out-of-place on-foot gameplay elements, the game would still fall flat due to its lackluster presentation and minimal level of actual fun. The game isn't without its pros, but weigh them against its compost pile of cons, and Spy Hunter: Nowhere to Run becomes little more than a Z-list title relegated to the bargain bin. Thanks for trying, Midway, but this ride's a broken-down lemon."

In 2017, at The Game Awards 2017, Dwayne Johnson recalled his time with the game and its poor reception, sarcastically stating "I'm still loving that 3/10 review from Game Informer, by the way. 3 out of 10! Thanks, guys. I'm still pissed at that!" while holding up his middle finger. Kevin Hart jokingly states "3 out of 10 is not that bad!", referring to the game.
