= Loadout =

2014 video game

- Developer: Edge of Reality
- Publisher: Edge of Reality
- Platforms: Windows, PlayStation 4
- Release: Windows; January 31, 2014; PlayStation 4 December 16, 2014
- Genre: Third-person shooter
- Mode: Multiplayer

Loadout is a free-to-play multiplayer third-person shooter developed by Edge of Reality. It was released on Steam for Microsoft Windows, then co-published as a special PlayStation 4 version with P-40 Online Entertainment. Loadout focused on arcade-style multiplayer firefights across a variety of modes and used exaggerated cartoon gore. Players could alter the appearance of their in-game avatar, as well as the properties of their weapons using in-game currency.

Edge of Reality has since discontinued development of the game. On January 23, 2018, CE-Asia (in collaboration with P-40) published the game on PlayStation 4 in several Asian countries as a paid "Premium Edition". Other game servers were closed on May 24, 2018, due to the inability to comply with the onset of the European Union's General Data Protection Regulation. On September 26, 2020, Loadout Premium's servers were shut down due to inability to afford the server cost. However, a fan project is currently attempting to revive the game and has brought working multiplayer.

== Reception ==
Reception

Aggregate scores
Aggregator	Score
GameRankings	(PC) 72.56%
Metacritic	(PC) 72/100 (PS4) 59/100

Review scores
Publication	Score
GameSpot	7/10
IGN	6.9/10
PC Gamer (UK)	77/100
Hardcore Gamer	4/5
The Escapist	4/5

Loadout received mixed to positive critic reviews (72 on Metacritic), 4 out of 5 stars (51,800 player reviews) on PlayStation 4, and “Very Positive” (35,986 player reviews) on Steam.

The Escapist gave Loadout a rating score of 80 and wrote this bottom line in their review: "A surprisingly well crafted multiplayer shooter full of options, amusing cartoon violence, and rock solid action. That Loadout does all this, and provides a respectably balanced free-to-play ecosystem, is encouraging to see."

Hardcore Gamer rated the game a 9 out of 10 and wrote this closing comment: "It didn't take me long to realize that Loadout wasn't an ordinary shooter. It's an amalgamation of sorts, melding comedy, cartoon violence and competitive multiplayer seamlessly. Edge of Reality seems to be well aware of the genres' over saturation, and contribute very little to the nimiety of mediocrity. Shooters may be all the craze now, but Loadout doesn't take the challenge of being different sitting down — it stands, with a severed head and a badass rifle. There are few online-only experiences that offer such dynamic gameplay without developing some sort of genre-identity crisis. Hell, the fast-paced matches, alarmingly meaty weapon customization system, and visual hilarity are but a few of the features that make Loadout worth its weight in dismembered limbs. So why wait? There's simply no better time to kill your friends than the present. Although the game modes may not be innovative, innovation doesn't always spell fun, and that's something Loadout has by the explosive crate-full."

PC Gamer gave the game a 77 and said in their review, “Loadout's gun customization and well executed twists on shooter staples make it a free-to-play game that doesn't feel like a compromise."

IGN gave Loadout a 69, stating in their review: “Loadout attempts to compete with Team Fortress 2 at its own game, and it performs admirably thanks to great weapon customization options, strong map design, and a generous free-to-play setup that charges mostly for cosmetics. But the matchmaking system is straight-up broken, leading to frequent frustrating mismatches, and its four maps aren't enough to keep me around for long."

== Game Modes ==
There are seven game modes: Death Snatch, Blitz, Jackhammer, Annihilation, and Extraction, Domination, and Campaign, most of which are based around collecting Blutonium, a fictional element.

=== Death Snatch ===
Upon killing an enemy player, a vial of Blutonium will drop, which can be grabbed to add to the team's score.

=== Extraction ===
Extraction is a game mode in which the first team to collect the most Blutonium wins. At the start of a match a player is designated as the Collector. Collectors travel around picking up Blutonium and depositing it in the provided baskets to increase their team's score. The Collectors are chosen randomly from the currently alive players.

=== Blitz ===
The map is dotted with poles, and one is designated as a control point. Teams will compete for control of the point, as standing near it slowly raises a cream-colored pair of boxers, as well as taking down the enemy's boxers. When the boxers reach the top of the flag, the point is captured, and it is added to the team's score.

=== Jackhammer ===
Jackhammer is a game mode similar to Capture the Flag, except the player can kill people with the flag. The goal is to take the enemy's hammer and return it to the player's base. When the enemy's hammer is in control, the player can smash people with it, killing them instantly. Each hammer has 5 smashes per capture. Capturing the hammer will add to the team's score.

=== Annihilation ===
Annihilation is a game mode that combines elements from other game modes. The goal is to get a team score of 10,000. Several things can add to the team's score. Players drop Blutonium vials on death, similar to Death Snatch. The vials can be picked up to gain team score points. As well, there are two control points that can be captured to gain a temporary damage buff and add to the team score, similar to Blitz. There is also a Jackhammer, which can be captured and used to kill people. Adding to the team score will give the player a growing supply of personal Blutonium, which can be used to purchase upgrades for their character. There are three types of upgrades. The first is attack, which buffs one's amount of damage dealt, the second is Tank, which increases the amount of damage a player is able to withstand, and Health, which increases the healing that player can give to others and adds to the effectiveness of health packs. Once a team has reached 10,000 points, the team must take the enemy's hammer back to their base, and charge it. Then, the team must take the hammer back to the enemy's base, and smash it inside the base, destroying it, finally winning the match.

=== Domination ===
Domination is a game mode where the player captures points, and each team starts at 0 points. Twenty points are awarded when a point is captured, and 5 per second while the point is captured. Each team must capture the point once it is captured by the other team. If there is a red arrow under the point at the top of the screen, the other team is capturing the point.

=== Campaign ===
In the campaign, up to four players can play cooperatively through missions which are divided into about 5 or 6 “chapters”, each mission with its own goal. Many of these missions have to do with killing aliens known as "Kroads". Each mission will reward the player with different kind of loot, such as loot crates, Blutonium, Spacebux, and other things.
