= 4x4 Evo =

2000 video game

- North American Dreamcast cover art
- Developer: Terminal Reality
- Publisher: Gathering of Developers
- Platforms: Dreamcast, Macintosh, Windows, PlayStation 2
- Release: Windows, Macintosh, Dreamcast: NA: October 26, 2000; PlayStation 2: NA: April 3, 2001; EU: April 13, 2001
- Genre: Racing
- Modes: Single player, multiplayer

4x4 Evo (also re-released as 4x4 Evolution) is a video game developed by Terminal Reality for the Windows, Macintosh, Sega Dreamcast, and PlayStation 2 platforms. It is one of the first console games to have cross-platform online play where Dreamcast, Macintosh, and Windows versions of the game appear online at the same time. The game can use maps created by users to download onto a hard drive as well as a Dreamcast VMU. All versions of the game are similar in quality and gameplay although the online systems feature a mode to customize the players' own truck and use it online. The game is still online-capable on all systems except for PlayStation 2. This was Terminal Reality's only video game to be released for the Dreamcast.

== Gameplay ==
The player driving a Toyota Tacoma Xtracab V6 during a race at Black Gold

Gameplay features off-road racing of over 70 licensed truck manufacturers. Modes featured in the game were Career Mode, Online Mode, Map editor, and versus mode. The career mode is the most important part of the game to feature a way to buy better trucks similar to the Gran Turismo series. The Career mode also gives the player six purpose-built race vehicles: Chevrolet TrailBlazer Race SUV 2WD, Dodge Dakota Race Truck 4WD, Ford F-150 Race Truck 2WD, Mitsubishi Pajero Rally 4WD, Nissan Xterra Race SUV 4WD, and the Toyota Tundra Race Truck 2WD. They cost anywhere from $350,000 up to $850,000. These are the fastest vehicles in the game. Recently, KC Vale acquired permission from Terminal Reality, Incorporated to upload the game to his Web server, but the original vehicles have been removed due to an expired license.

=== Multiplayer ===
Although this game was released many years ago, the online community still exists with a fair number of players and some moderators who manage chat rooms. Dedicated servers are long gone, but it is possible to host games over the Internet and join other player-hosted games.

The game was brought back online thanks to the Dreamcast community as one of the more than 100 games so far to be brought back online for the Dreamcast.

== Reception ==
Reception

Aggregate score
Aggregator	Score			
Aggregator	Dreamcast	Macintosh	PC	PS2
Metacritic	74/100	N/A	73/100	64/100

Review scores
Publication	Score			
Publication	Dreamcast	Macintosh	PC	PS2
CNET Gamecenter	7/10	N/A	8/10	N/A
Computer Gaming World	N/A	N/A	4/5	N/A
Electronic Gaming Monthly	6/10	N/A	N/A	5.5/10
EP Daily	8/10	N/A	8/10	7.5/10
Eurogamer	N/A	N/A	8/10	N/A
Game Informer	8.75/10	N/A	N/A	8/10
GameSpot	8.1/10	N/A	8.4/10	7.2/10
GameSpy	N/A	N/A	75%	N/A
IGN	7.5/10	N/A	8.2/10	5/10
MacLife	N/A	"Spiffy"	N/A	N/A
Macworld	N/A	4/5	N/A	N/A
Next Generation	3/5	N/A	N/A	2/5
Official U.S. PlayStation Magazine	N/A	N/A	N/A	4/5
PC Gamer (US)	N/A	N/A	78%	N/A
Maxim	N/A	N/A	N/A	6/10

The game received "mixed or average reviews" on all platforms according to the review aggregation website Metacritic. Rob Smolka of NextGen said of the Dreamcast version in its February 2001 issue, "Other than the online play, this arcade racer doesn't do anything special we haven't seen (and complained about) before." Four issues later, however, David Chen called the PS2 version "A competent racer with lots of options but a few too many significant flaws."

GameFan gave the Dreamcast version 92%, saying, "Virtually lag-free play, spot-on looks, and a tremendous amount of fun elevate 4x4 to the top of Dreamcast racers with little to no effort." GameZone gave the PC version 8.5 out of 10, calling it "a solid racing program. Great attention has been paid to the details of off-road racing, and you can enjoy every jolt and bump from a driver's perspective. This program breaks new ground in multi-platform gaming, and supports that with a game that is easy to jump right into the driver's seat and play." However, Computer Games Strategy Plus gave the same PC version three out of five, saying, "4X4 Evolution has its place in history as the first truly multi-platform multiplayer game, and will be remembered for that impressive technical accomplishment alone. It's too bad the game itself isn't nearly as memorable." AllGame gave the PlayStation 2 version two stars out of five, saying, "Overall, the publishers made darned sure that 4x4 EVO would cover its bases by hitting every one of the marketing bullet points on the back of the box, but the game itself doesn't deliver enough visceral excitement to justify the fairly steep price tag. Unless you're absolutely itching to tear up somebody's junkyard in your Lexus SUV, you're better served putting the money into a weekend getaway to the desert or the mountains with the real truck that's sitting right now in your garage."

Jake The Snake of GamePro said that the Dreamcast version "has plenty of cool features—beautiful tracks that let you roam freely, nearly every pickup and SUV on the market, adjustable steering—yet the racing is straightforward and, because of wimpy sound effects and a limited number of opponents, sometimes even dull." (Note: GamePro gave the Dreamcast version two 4/5 scores for graphics and fun factor, 3.5/5 for sound, and 4.5/5 for control.) Dan Elektro said of the PlayStation 2 version, "real-world car details, challenging A.I., and a nice upgrade system make 4x4 Evolution worth checking out, especially if you're an SUV fanatic in real life." (Note: GamePro gave the PlayStation 2 version 4/5 for graphics, sound, control, and fun factor.) However, Brian Wright said of the PC version, "If you absolutely have to experience driving off-road in your Lexus RX300, 4x4 Evolution is your game. The tracks are fun and the Career mode will keep you busy, but if you want to experience the thrill of pure speed, you'd best look elsewhere." (Note: GamePro gave the PC version 4.5/5 for graphics, two 3.5/5 scores for sound and control, and 3/5 for fun factor.)

The PC version sold 41,500 units in the U.S. by October 2001.

The same PC version was nominated for the Racing Game of the Year award at the CNET Gamecenter Computer Game Awards for 2000, whose winner was unfortunately lost to time. The game itself won the award for Cross-Platform at GameSpy's Best of 2000 Awards. The Dreamcast version was a nominee at The Electric Playground's 2000 Blister Awards for "Best Console Driving Game", but lost to Smuggler's Run.

== Sequel ==
4x4 Evo 2 was later released on Windows, Macintosh, Xbox, GameCube, and PlayStation 2. It features larger maps, denser terrain, and free-roaming environments. The game introduces Adventure Mission mode, where the player performs treasure hunts and rescue operations to obtain additional money.
