= MoonBaseOne =

2007 video game

- Developer: WeCreateGames Studios
- Publisher: Federation of Galaxy Explorers
- Designer: Jay Crossler
- Platform: Microsoft Windows
- Release: July 15, 2007
- Genre: Action-adventure game
- Mode: Single player

MoonBaseOne is an educational video game . It was developed by American company WeCreateGames.com, and was published by Federation of Galaxy Explorers. Posted for free download on July 15, 2007, MoonBaseOne was developed as an educational tool to be used at FOGE summer camps to teach kids about space.

== Synopsis ==
=== Plot ===
The game centers on an astronaut, who newly arrived to Moon Base One. The playable character is a male referred to by his title: "Miner". The period wherein the story is set is a hypothetical 2030 future in which mining robots, settlements and advanced vehicles are on the Moon. The current version of the game allows the player to compete in two adventures aimed at mining the lunar Regolith to find minerals, build additional mining robots, and complete adventures for other characters.

== Gameplay ==
=== Mining Subsystem ===
MoonBaseOne features a novel player-mining system where the player can mine areas of regolith for minerals. Minerals yields are determined by lunar height, terrain type, quality of mining gear, and amount of minerals previously discovered.

=== Mining Robot Subsystem ===
Up to seven Mining robots can be purchased to assist the Miner in finding minerals. These robots can be enhanced by upgrades and enhancements, which make them mine faster, yield more minerals, communicate to other bots, return to base, and intelligently avoid poor mining zones. Upgrades are either found by working with other Non-Player Characters, or by completing real-world science lessons at the Lunar Academy computer terminal.

=== Economic Subsystem ===
An economic subsystem provides an advanced economy based on multiple types of minerals. Prices fluctuate over time in response to supply and demand, and factor into player missions. This economic subsystem is handled through the Yack conversation system built for the Torque Gaming Engine.

== Volunteers ==
MoonBaseOne was completely written and developed by volunteers.

- Nick Eftimiades - President of FOGE
- Jay Crossler - Senior Game Designer and Senior Programmer
- Andre Morales - Game Designer and 3D artist
- Dr. J Behrens - Writer and dialogue designer
- Derek Casari - Sound Effects and voice prompts
- Peter Wylie - Voice actor
- Phil Smith - Space Artist
- Bruce Hanifan - Soundtrack composer
- Jason Tugman - Video Editor

MoonBaseOne is available as a free download from the development site listed below.
