= Missed Messages =

2019 video game

missed messages.
- Developer: Angela He
- Publisher: Angela He
- Platforms: Windows, Mac OS, Linux, Browser
- Release: May 1, 2019; May 21, 2019 (Steam)
- Genre: Visual novel
- Mode: Single-player

Missed Messages (stylized as missed messages.) is a freeware visual novel game developed and published by Angela He. It was released on itch.io on May 1, 2019 and on Steam on May 21. The game has four different endings that explores the themes of depression, suicidality, and family pressure. It was originally developed for the Ludum Dare game jam.

It is available for Windows, Mac, and Linux on Steam or on browser (desktop-only) on itch.io and CrazyGames. The game also has a fan pack DLC that includes wallpapers, sketches, and a bonus scene.

== Reception ==
Jay Castello of Rock Paper Shotgun stated that the game had a realistic depiction of "romance, horror, and memes", saying it was helped by the fact that the game was based on the developer's real experiences. Calling the game's artwork "completely gorgeous", she said the game became more intense as it went on, and that she got two different endings depending on whether she was distracted by idle things or paid attention to subtle hints. The game was featured in The Verge's column Short Play, dedicated to short games, where it was described as "deftly and efficiently [using] its first playthrough to put you in the right emotional space", noting the importance of the game's replay value. It received an 84/100 score in the September 2019 issue of PC Gamer UK, where reviewer Tom Sykes commented, "Mental illness, I think, is one of gaming's favourite topics, but few explore it at surface level, or with as much skill as this lovely visual novel".
