= Metallic Child =

2021 video game

- Developer: Studio HG (Note: Studio HG is a group within development studio Action Square.)
- Publisher: HIKE
- Platforms: Windows, Nintendo Switch
- Release: September 16, 2021
- Genres: Action, roguelite
- Mode: Single-player

Metallic Child (stylized as METALLIC CHILD) is an isometric action roguelite video game developed by South Korean one-man team Studio HG and published by HIKE. It was released for Nintendo Switch and Windows on September 16, 2021.

== Gameplay ==
Metallic Child is a hack and slash video game where the player can attack enemy robots, pick them up, and throw them. The player can find Cores, sometimes by defeating enemies, which can give positive effects or negative effects, such as slowing down the player.

== Plot ==
The player controls Rona, a female android known as a Metallic Child, who must stop a rebellion onboard a spaceship. To stop the spaceship from crashing, she must defeat the other similar robots of her line.

== Development and release ==
Metallic Child was developed by Studio HG. The development took three years. It was released on 16 September 2021 for Nintendo Switch and Windows.

== Reception ==
Reception

Aggregate scores
Aggregator	Score
Metacritic	73%
OpenCritic	77%

Review scores
Publication	Score
Nintendo Life	8/10
TouchArcade	3.5/5

Metallic Child received favorable reviews for its controls and visuals, but with criticism for its repetitive gameplay. It earned an aggregate score of 73% from Metacritic. Stuart Gipp of Nintendo Life considers it a spiritual successor to Mega Man and Mighty No. 9. Shaun Musgrave of TouchArcade criticizes the repetitive nature of this game while praising the other aspects. Aaron Rodriguez of MeriStation praises the unique core mechanic of this game.

This game has received the Best PC & Console made with Unity awards for 2019 and Official Selection for BitSummit 7.
