= Mr. Robot (video game) =

2007 video game

- Developer: Moonpod
- Publisher: Moonpod
- Designer: Mark Featherstone
- Platform: Microsoft Windows
- Release: 10 January 2007
- Genres: Adventure, RPG, platformer
- Mode: Single-player

Mr. Robot is a 3D video game by British studio Moonpod, published as shareware, which attempts to combine the genres of role-playing video game and platform game.

The platform adventure part of the game takes place on board a spaceship called The Eidolon which is destined for a remote colony planet when things start to go wrong. The player takes the part of Asimov, a "lowly service droid", who must attempt to save the humans stored in cryosleep. The RPG element takes place inside a virtual computer world in which the player can hack computer terminals to combat defense computer programs via a turn-based battle system.

== Reception ==
Reception

Aggregate scores
| Aggregator | Score |
|---|---|
| GameRankings | 85% |
| Metacritic | 83/100 |

The game won the 9.6/10 Editor's choice gold award at VG Core and scored 87% in PC Format magazine, and also won the award for 'best ending' in the PC Format 2007 game awards. It scored 82% in PC Gamer UK magazine.
