= Mad Trax =

1998 video game

- Developer: RayLand Interactive
- Publisher: Project Two Interactive BV
- Platform: Microsoft Windows
- Release: Microsoft Windows: NA: December 11,1998; Poland: April 22, 1999
- Genres: Racing, Action (Vehicular combat)
- Modes: Single-player, multiplayer

Mad Trax is a 1998 video game developed by RayLand Interactive and published by Project Two Interactive for Microsoft Windows. It is a futuristic racing video game.

== Gameplay ==
Power-ups can be purchased by spending coins collected throughout courses, and include abilities such as invincibility, and weapons including missiles and land mines. Mad Trax features a multiplayer mode over a local area network or the Internet.

== Development ==
Mad Trax was created by a six-person team in French development studio RayLand Interactive, created in a six-month period between May to November 1998. The studio originally developed Mad Trax as a tech demo to showcase the capabilities of the Voodoo 2 graphics card, showcasing it at a 3dfx booth at Comdex.

== Reception ==
Reception

Review scores
| Publication | Score |
|---|---|
| AllGame | 4/5 |
| Ultimate PC | 66% |

Several previews of Mad Trax unfavorably considered the game resembled other futuristic racing titles, with PC PowerPlay writing that the game seemed to lack new or innovative features to distinguish them from the large number of games in the genre. IGN faulted the game for the simplicity and lack of variation in its tracks, and the sensitivity of its controls.
