= Matt Hayes' Fishing =

2002 video game

- Developer: Electronic Arts Seattle
- Publisher: Electronic Arts
- Platform: Windows
- Release: 2002
- Genre: Fishing
- Mode: Single-player

Matt Hayes' Fishing is a fishing video game for Windows, released in 2002 by Electronic Arts and endorsed by British angler Matt Hayes.

In the game the player can fish for seven species of fish (northern pike, perch, zander, chub, rainbow trout, brown trout and salmon) in the following European locations:

- Loch Lomond in Scotland
- Lough Derg in Ireland
- Grafham Water in Cambridgeshire, England
- a generic British gravel pit.
- River Usk in Wales
- Gamlebyviken, an inlet of the Baltic Sea near Västervik in Sweden.
