= Monato Esprit =

2009 video game

- Developer: Gamasoft
- Publishers: Reality Gap; IT Territory
- Platform: Windows ME/2K/XP
- Release: 2009
- Genre: MMORPG
- Mode: MMO

Monato Esprit was a 3D, fantasy-themed massively multiplayer online role-playing game. The game was released in July 2009 and reached the open beta stage of development before its shutdown sometime in 2012. Monato Esprit was free to download and used the e-currency "MetaTIX" as its billing system.

== Gameplay ==
Monato Esprit followed many of the traditional structures of other MMORPGs. Players took control of an avatar (or "character") within a persistent world. Characters explored the landscape, delved through dungeons, fought monsters, completed quests, and interacted with NPCs as well as other players. Successfully defeating monsters and completing quests yielded items and experience points. As characters gained levels, they had the opportunity to use more powerful skills and better equipment. Characters could group together into parties and work together to achieve short-term goals, or create guilds, which served as long-term social networks.

=== Combat ===
Combat was designed to accommodate younger and casual players. The game featured strictly player versus environment action and emphasized cooperation between players. The interface was simple and primarily mouse-driven, with a third-person perspective and a movable camera. To enter combat, players clicked on monsters they encountered in the world. Each successful strike resulted in damage to the monster's hit points, while the monster attacks in turn. Characters that lost all their hit points were revived in the nearest safe point, and there was no further punishment for defeat. If a monster lost all of its hit points, it was defeated and could be looted for items. Party members could select various "looting modes" to determine how items are divided up.

Each character had a number of skills to augment his or her combat potential. When characters gained a level, they received a skill point that could be used to buy a rank in a skill. At least one rank is required to use a skill, and further ranks increased its effectiveness. The skills available for purchase were dependent on the character's level and class. Each class had its own unique skill roster, with more powerful skills becoming available as the character gained levels. Skills were broken into two categories: passive and active. Passive skills permanently increased the character's attributes and were always functioning. Active skills included attack spells, special melee strikes, healing, and temporary enchantments. Using an active skill cost mana, which limited the number of times a skill could be used over a short period.

=== Inventory ===
Characters earned items by defeating monsters, completing quests, and trading with other players. Items were stored in the character's inventory, which was divided into a number of bags with 16 slots each. Some items such as weapons took up an entire slot, while smaller items such as potions stacked together in a single slot. Each character starts with two bags, and could gain more at higher levels. Players could map items to hotkeys by placing them in their "quick bar". Excess items could be stored in the bank. All cities in Monato Esprit provided access to the bank, which could hold an additional 25 slots of inventory.

Characters also had 10 equipment slots for items that they wore, which included armor, jewelry, wings and weapons. Character models changed to reflect what weapons and armor the character was currently wearing. Weapons and armor had endurance ratings that would lower over time as they are worn during combat. When an item's endurance rating reaches zero, it would become unusable. Items could be repaired by blacksmiths in cities at the cost of MetaTIX. Jewelry and wings did not have endurance ratings and never needed repair.

Some items could be combined to create new items with alchemy. Characters learned how to create items by finding alchemy recipes. Each recipe included three to six types of ingredients. The more powerful the item, the more challenging it was to find the necessary ingredients. Common items made through alchemy included potions, which restored hit points and mana. Characters could also find enchantment scrolls that add magical bonuses to equipment. Enchantments only be performed by Alchemist NPCs in cities, at the cost of MetaTIX.

== World ==
=== Setting ===
Isildra, a city in Monato Esprit

The game takes place in Monato Esprit, a magical world where the dreams of the innocent have created a paradise of imagination. Monato Esprit is maintained by the Basileus Crystal, which focuses the energy of moonlight to power the world. Dreamers are ushered into the world by the radiance of the crystal to become Archons, a race of humanoids with wings. Archons have built great civilizations throughout the dreamworld and enjoyed a golden age of peace and prosperity.

A short time before the setting of the game, a dark presence descended upon Monato Esprit and infected the Basileus Crystal, allowing Nightmares to manifest in the dreamworld. Nightmares corrupted the harmless plants and creatures of Monato Esprit and turned them into monsters. The Archons must now rise against these monsters to protect their fragile paradise.

Players began the game as a young dreamer who enters Monato Esprit for the first time. After receiving tutorial missions from several helpful Archons, the player could teleport to Isildra, the first city in the game. From that point, the player was free to adventure through the world as he or she wishes.

=== Zones ===
The world of Monato Esprit was divided into zones, which come in three categories: cities, countryside, and instance dungeons. City zones were urban settlements created by the Archons. They featured a large number of friendly NPCs and were completely free of monsters. Within city zones, players could receive and complete quests without fear of attack. Cities also served as convenient meeting grounds for parties and guilds. Countryside zones were wilder areas of the world that had become infested with nightmares. Some countryside zones featured small Archon settlements with friendly NPCs, but these areas were not safe from monster attacks. Instance dungeons were special areas separated from the main world and could only be accessed through a gatekeeper. While inside an instance dungeon, characters' maps did not function, forcing players to find their own way through the maze. The objective for each dungeon was to find and defeat its boss. Although these areas were generically known as "dungeons", they came in a variety of visual styles, from catacombs to sunny forests.

=== Crystals ===
The world of Monato Esprit was powered by Crystals, which provided magical benefits to characters who stand near them. Red crystals healed hit points, blue crystals restored mana, and yellow crystals restored both. Because characters' hit points and mana did not naturally regenerate over time, crystals were a valuable resource for characters who are short on potions.

== Characters ==
All player characters were young Archons, a race of winged humanoids. During character creation, players had the opportunity to customize their characters' appearance, modifying their gender, hair style, hair color, eye shape, and eye color. Players also chose a zodiac sign and season for their characters at creation. Archons received bonuses such as an increase in attack damage or hit points depending on the sign and season to which they were aligned.

Each player account could store up to three characters at one time.

=== Classes ===
All characters began the game as a "Novice" until fifth level, at which point the player chose one of six specialized classes. Class determined how many hit points and mana points characters received at each level, what equipment they could use, and which skills they could buy. Characters that reached tenth level in a class could become "reborn" and restart in another class at level one. Available classes were:

- Hwarang – The elite warriors of Monato Esprit, focusing on offensive melee combat. They fight with two-handed swords for maximum damage, and wear metal armor. Their skills include powerful sword strikes and elemental attacks. The class is based on the historical warrior society of Korea.
- Templar – A society of powerful guardians who are charged with defending temples and other holy places. Templars specialize in defensive combat, wielding swords and shields and wearing metal armor. Their skills include powerful strikes as well as defensive enchantments that make them almost impossible to injure. The class is based on the medieval military order.
- Mage – Masters of the four elements, Mages wield destructive magic. Their skills include long-range attack spells as well as enchantments that augment their offensive potential. They are physically weak, however, and only wear cloth armor. Their staffs serve as melee weapons and also increase the power of their spells.
- Cleric – Holy caretakers of the dreamworld, Clerics use the healing power of dreams to protect and restore the wounded. This class serves a vital support role in any party, casting enchantments to protect and heal party members. Clerics are not particularly suited to melee combat. They wear cloth armor and wield wands that heighten the power of their magic.
- Sheriff – These dedicated peace officers bring justice to the wild places in the dreamworld. Sheriffs specialize in long-range combat with firearms, and are the only Archons who are trained to use them. This class is based on the gunslinger archetype of the American Old West.
- Harlequin – Cunning rogues who wander the dreamworld in search of adventure. Harlequins are known as much for their showmanship as their power, fighting with such daring that every combat becomes a work of art. This class is loosely based on the comical theater characters.

== In-game economy ==
Monato Esprit was the first MMO to use the e-currency MetaTIX. Players purchased MetaTIX and used them like admission tickets to gain entrance to special areas in the world and purchase various services such as teleportation. MetaTIX also served as the in-game currency for the world of Monato Esprit, much like "gold" in other MMOs, and could be used to purchase items from other players. There wereare no merchant NPCs in the game world, so all trade was conducted between players. This system allows the player community to determine items' value and regulate the economy without developer interference.

The economic system in Monato Esprit was based on the research of Edward Castronova into the real world economy at work in EverQuest. Castronova discovered that a unit of currency in Norrath was worth more than the Yen or Lira, and playing EverQuest yielded more wealth per hour than the average wage of a Bulgarian worker. While other MMOs such as EverQuest and World of Warcraft attempt to restrict players from earning profit through gaming, Monato Esprit hads built the concept into the game itself. Players could use the profits they earned in Monato Esprit to buy and play new games that accepted the currency.

== Production ==
Monato Esprit was under development by the Korean company Gamasoft. The English language release was being published by Reality Gap, Inc. The Russian language release was being published by IT Territory, LLC (part of Astrum Online Entertainment holding). The game reached open beta stage of development before it was shut down.
