= Terminal Reality =

American video game developer

- Type: Private
- Industry: Video games
- Founded: October 1994; 31 years ago
- Founder: Mark Randel; Brett Combs
- Headquarters: Lewisville, Texas, U.S.
- Key people: Brett Russell; Brett Combs; Mark Randel; Brendan Goss; Drew Haworth; John O'Keefe

Terminal Reality is an American video game development and production company based in Lewisville, Texas. Founded in October 1994 by ex-Microsoft employee Mark Randel and former Mallard Software general manager Brett Combs, Terminal Reality developed a variety of games including racing games (such as 4x4 EVO 2), 3D action games (such as BloodRayne), and more.

== History ==
After leaving the Bruce Artwick Organization in mid-1994, Randel and Combs founded Terminal Reality in October 1994, which required Randel leave Chicago where he had just finished up on his BSE and MS in electrical engineering from University of Illinois. The goal of Terminal Reality was to exploit texture mapped 3D game engines, with only $1000, and working out of Brett Combs' home. During that time it was developing its first release, Terminal Velocity, and pulled together $120,000, received advances on the game and were basically able to avoid giving up ownership and primary decision rights to venture capitalists. After that first year the company generated $1.2 million and nearly doubled it the second year with $2.1 million.

Terminal Reality's first game, Terminal Velocity, was a 3-D air combat game, Brett Combs pitched to Garland-based publisher 3D Realms. 3D Realms was the new division started by the popular Apogee Software known for its arcade style action shooters and titles such as Wolfenstein 3D. Scott Miller was intrigued by Randel's technology and Combs' management. Scott later said in a Dallas Business Journal report that "They had the backgrounds and track records with proven experience to pull off the game they were pitching to us."

Terminal Reality went on, after the success of Terminal Velocity with 3D Realms, to publish titles with Microsoft such as Fury3, Hellbender, Monster Truck Madness, CART Precision Racing and Monster Truck Madness 2. By January 1998, Terminal Reality became an equity partner and founding developer of Gathering of Developers, a Dallas, Texas based publisher in which Brett Combs served on the Board of Directors.

In December 2013, Terminal Reality closed down and liquidated its office outside Dallas, Texas.

On April 11, 2018, Infernal Technology, LLC and Terminal Reality, Inc. ("Infernal") filed a complaint for patent infringement against Microsoft Corporation ("Microsoft"). The asserted patents, U.S. 6,362,822 and U.S. 7,061,488, relate to lighting and shadowing methods for graphics simulation. According to Infernal, both patents have already survived an Inter Partes Review challenge filed by Electronic Arts in 2016.

On November 20, 2020, the company released BloodRayne: Terminal Cut and BloodRayne 2: Terminal Cut with Ziggurat Interactive. On 2021, the remastered release for console. In January 2023 the two companies partnered again on an enhanced re-release of Terminal Velocity called Terminal Velocity: Boosted Edition. In June the game was released on the Xbox One and Xbox Series, PlayStation 4 and 5, and Nintendo Switch.

== Technology ==
=== Infernal Engine ===
In addition to game development, Terminal Reality is also the creator of the Infernal Engine: a cross-platform, full-featured foundation for building video games that the company licenses to other developers and publishers. The Infernal Engine is a unified system, providing rendering, physics, sound, AI, and metrics.

A key component to the Infernal Engine is the VELOCITY Physics Engine: a physics simulator that offers an advanced collision system, dynamic destruction for scenery and environmental objects, accurate vehicle driving dynamics, real human body physics with anatomical joint constraints and simulated muscles/tendons, hair and cloth simulation for actors.

=== Photex engine ===
The Photex (Photo-texture) engine was the first photorealistic game engine created by Terminal Reality, developed from the Monster Truck Madness engine. The first game built on this technology was CART Precision Racing, and the final game was Fly! II, which used Photex3. Monster Truck Madness 2 was heavily promoted by Microsoft (its producer) for using the Photex2 engine, which, at the time of its release, was a cutting-edge rendering engine. Most of its games used the Terrain geometry engine. This engine was known for its very fast rendering in low-end pcs, photorealistic images and true color textures.

The Photex2 game engine was composed of two components: the Photex2 rendering engine and the Terrain5 geometry engine.

=== Nocturne engine ===
Previously named "Demon engine", it is the rendering engine used in Nocturne and Blair Witch trilogy (Volume I: Rustin Parr, Volume II: The Legend of Coffin Rock, Volume III: The Elly Kedward Tale).

=== KAGE engine ===
Developed by the now former TRI employee Paul Nettle, originally written using software rendering, but later adapted to use the OpenGL API.

=== EVO engine ===
Based on MTM2 Photex2 engine, it is the game engine used in 4x4 Evolution and 4x4 EVO 2.

== List of games ==
Year	Title	Platform(s)
1995	Terminal Velocity	DOS, macOS, Windows
1995	Fury3	Windows
1996	Hellbender	Windows
1996	Monster Truck Madness	Windows
1997	CART Precision Racing	Windows
1998	Monster Truck Madness 2	Windows
1999	Fly!	macOS, Windows
1999	Nocturne	Windows
2000	Blair Witch Volume I: Rustin Parr	Windows
2000	4x4 Evolution	Dreamcast, macOS, PlayStation 2, Windows
2001	Fly! II	macOS, Windows
2001	4x4 Evo 2	GameCube, macOS, PlayStation 2, Windows, Xbox
2002	BloodRayne	GameCube, macOS, PlayStation 2, Windows, Xbox
2003	RoadKill	GameCube, PlayStation 2, Xbox
2003	BlowOut	GameCube, PlayStation 2, Windows, Xbox
2004	BloodRayne 2	PlayStation 2, Windows, Xbox
2005	Æon Flux	PlayStation 2, Xbox
2006	The King of Fighters Collection: The Orochi Saga	PlayStation 2, PlayStation Portable, Wii
2006	SpyHunter: Nowhere to Run	PlayStation 2, Windows, Xbox
2006	Metal Slug Anthology	PlayStation 2, PlayStation Portable, Wii
2008	SNK Arcade Classics Vol. 1	PlayStation 2, PlayStation Portable, Wii
2008	Samurai Shodown Anthology	PlayStation 2, PlayStation Portable, Wii
2009	Ghostbusters: The Video Game	PlayStation 2, PlayStation 3, PlayStation 4, PlayStation Portable, Nintendo Switch, Wii, Windows, Xbox 360, Xbox One
2010	Def Jam Rapstar	PlayStation 3, Wii, Xbox 360
2012	Kinect Star Wars	Xbox 360
2013	The Walking Dead: Survival Instinct	PlayStation 3, Wii U, Windows, Xbox 360
2020	BloodRayne: Terminal Cut	Windows
2020	BloodRayne 2: Terminal Cut	Windows
2021	BloodRayne: ReVamped	PlayStation 4, PlayStation 5, Nintendo Switch, Xbox One, Xbox Series X/S
2021	BloodRayne 2: ReVamped	PlayStation 4, PlayStation 5, Nintendo Switch, Xbox One, Xbox Series X/S
2023	Terminal Velocity: Boosted Edition	PlayStation 4, PlayStation 5, Nintendo Switch, Windows, Xbox One, Xbox Series X/S

=== Cancelled ===
- Demonik (footage of the game appeared in the movie Grandma's Boy)
- Sundown (co-developed with Guillermo del Toro)
