= 4x4 Evo 2 =

2001 video game

- Developer: Terminal Reality
- Publishers: Microsoft Windows/Xbox; Gathering of Developers; Mac OS; Aspyr; GameCube; Universal Interactive; PlayStation 2; BAM! Entertainment
- Platforms: Microsoft Windows, Xbox, Mac OS, GameCube, PlayStation 2
- Release: Windows; NA: October 30, 2001; EU: June 20, 2002; Xbox; NA: November 15, 2001; EU: June 5, 2002; Mac OS; NA: February 13, 2002; GameCube; NA: September 24, 2002; PlayStation 2; EU: April 11, 2003
- Genre: Racing
- Modes: Single-player, multiplayer

4x4 Evo 2, also known as 4x4 Evolution 2, is a racing video game developed by Terminal Reality for the PlayStation 2, Xbox, GameCube, Microsoft Windows, and Mac. It is the sequel to 4x4 Evolution. The game's race courses are primarily in extreme environments such as deserts, canyons, and other off-road locales. Players are allowed to customize their vehicle to their liking with a variety of engines, suspensions, wheels, tires, and other aftermarket parts and modifications.

The game was released in 2001 and 2002 across various regions and platforms; while the PS2 version was released exclusively in Europe, the GameCube and Mac versions were only released in North America.

== Gameplay ==
The player may also play through missions set in various locations, which typically revolve around locating various objects in the area. Each location has multiple missions, which revolve around a single profession or storyline. Missions between areas are not intertwined, however, and are unrelated to the racing portion of career.

== Development ==
The game was announced in February 2000.

== Reception ==
Reception

Aggregate scores
Aggregator	Score				
Aggregator	GameCube	Macintosh	PC	PS2	Xbox
GameRankings	56%	N/A	65%	53%	61%
Metacritic	56/100	N/A	69/100	N/A	59/100

Review scores
Publication	Score				
Publication	GameCube	Macintosh	PC	PS2	Xbox
Computer Gaming World	N/A	N/A	2.5/5	N/A	N/A
Electronic Gaming Monthly	4/10	N/A	N/A	5.5/10	4.33/10 (Note: In Electronic Gaming Monthly's review of the Xbox version, one critic gave it 3/10, and the rest gave it each a score of 5/10.)
Eurogamer	N/A	N/A	4/10	N/A	N/A
Game Informer	8/10	N/A	N/A	N/A	7.5/10
GameRevolution	N/A	N/A	N/A	N/A	D
GameSpot	4.8/10	N/A	7.8/10	N/A	4.8/10
GameSpy	N/A	N/A	79%	N/A	N/A
GameZone	5.5/10	N/A	9.8/10	N/A	8.5/10
IGN	5.3/10	N/A	8.4/10	N/A	7.1/10
MacLife	N/A	3/5	N/A	N/A	N/A
Next Generation	N/A	N/A	N/A	N/A	2/5
Nintendo Power	3.2/5	N/A	N/A	N/A	N/A
Official Xbox Magazine (US)	N/A	N/A	N/A	N/A	5.5/10
PC Gamer (US)	N/A	N/A	52%	N/A	N/A

The GameCube, PC, and Xbox versions of 4x4 EVO 2 received "mixed or average reviews" according to the review aggregation website Metacritic. Jeff Lundrigan of NextGen called the latter console version "A case of too many options and not enough gameplay to back it up." Steve Bauman of Computer Games Magazine gave the PC version two stars out of five, saying, "As with the original, the multiplayer is actually solid, it's really quite attractive, and there's all that... stuff... in it, but this is really more of a downgrade from a rather mediocre original game than a 'take it to the next level' sequel."
