= Microsoft Baseball 2000 =

1999 video game

- Developer: WizBang! Software Productions
- Publisher: Microsoft
- Platform: Microsoft Windows
- Release: NA: April 20, 1999
- Genre: Sports
- Mode: Single player

Microsoft Baseball 2000 is a sports video game developed by WizBang! Software Productions and published by Microsoft. It was released for Microsoft Windows in 1999, as an updated version of Microsoft Baseball 3D 1998 Edition. Critics considered the game to be an improvement over its predecessor. It received praise for its graphics and $20 price, but was criticized for containing various glitches. It was followed by Microsoft Baseball 2001.

== Gameplay ==
Microsoft Baseball 2000 is an updated version of its predecessor, Microsoft Baseball 3D 1998 Edition. It features Major League Baseball (MLB) players, and 30 MLB stadiums. Players include Kevin Brown, Mark McGwire and Curt Schilling. It has several game modes, including QuickGame. There is also a training mode for pitching and fielding, while a home run derby mode allows for batting practice. Seasons consist of 162 games. Microsoft Baseball 2000 has three difficulty settings, and includes commentary by Thom Brennaman. The game also includes the General Manager, which allows the editing of baseball players' traits.

== Development and release ==
Microsoft Baseball 2000 was developed by WizBang! Software Productions, which also developed the previous game. Unlike its predecessor, the graphics of Microsoft Baseball 2000 do not require a 3D accelerator card to run, although the game does support the use of one for enhanced visuals. Brennaman spent eight days providing his dialogue as the game's commentator, and much of the script called for various inflections of each comment, contributing to the lengthy process. Brennaman, describing his voiceover experience, said, "You have to do the best you can while imagining plays in your mind. You have to act like it's taking place in front of you."

Microsoft Baseball 2000 was completed in April 1999, and was released in the United States later that month. It was published by Microsoft for Windows. The game was priced at $19.95 in an effort to appeal to a wide demographic. Baseball player Al Leiter is featured on the game's cover. Later in 1999, an updated MLB player roster was released for download through the game's website. A patch was also released that allowed for multi-display.

== Reception ==
Reception

Aggregate score
Aggregator	Score
GameRankings	73%

Review scores
Publication	Score
AllGame	2/5
CNET Gamecenter	8/10
Computer Games Strategy Plus	3/5
Computer Gaming World	3/5
EP Daily	8/10
GameFan	77%
GamePro	4/5
GameSpot	6.9/10
GameZone	8.428/10
IGN	7/10
PC Accelerator	6/10
PC Gamer (US)	59%
Sports Gaming Network	86%

The game received above-average reviews according to the review aggregation website GameRankings.

Critics viewed the game as an improvement over its predecessor, although some still considered High Heat Baseball 2000 to be a superior baseball game choice. The Milwaukee Journal Sentinel considered the game to be near-perfect. Joel Strauch of GamePro praised the improvement in gameplay and controls, while GameSpot's Michael E. Ryan praised the addition of a mid-range difficulty setting. Ryan stated that Microsoft Baseball 2000 had the best pitching interface of any baseball video game, although he described fielding as "very tough" and stated that the game's computer-assisted base running was problematic. Joshua Roberts of AllGame wrote that the game "has just the bare minimum and there's nothing in its actual gameplay to make up for its glaring omissions."

The graphics were praised, as was the game's $20 price. The San Diego Union-Tribune wrote that the game "offers the best budget baseball experience on the PC this summer, and also one of the best at any price."

Reviewers criticized various audio and visual glitches that are present in the game. Jason Bates of IGN complained of frequent lock-ups during gameplay, and Strauch noted long loading times. Scott Silverstein, writing for The Washington Times, stated that it took four attempts across an 80-minute period to get the game running on a computer which had easily met the system requirements.

Rick Worrell of Sports Gaming Network criticized the commentary for a number of audio glitches, but he praised the sound effects. Roberts found the commentary to be stiff, while other critics praised it. William Abner of Computer Games Strategy Plus called the commentary "fairly entertaining and usually accurate." Strauch stated that it was rarely repetitive, and wrote that the crowd noises "fluctuate appropriately".
