= Microsoft Baseball 3D 1998 Edition =

1998 video game

- Developers: Microsoft; WizBang! Software Productions
- Publisher: Microsoft
- Platform: Microsoft Windows
- Release: NA: July 1, 1998
- Genre: Sports
- Mode: Single player

Microsoft Baseball 3D 1998 Edition, also known as simply Microsoft Baseball 3D, is a sports video game developed by Microsoft and WizBang! Software Productions. It was released for Microsoft Windows in 1998. It received praise for its graphics, but criticism for numerous glitches and its varying difficulty. It was followed by Microsoft Baseball 2000 and Microsoft Baseball 2001.

== Gameplay ==
Microsoft Baseball 3D includes all of the players, teams and ballparks from the 1997 Major League Baseball season. Players include Ron Gant, Lance Johnson, Mickey Morandini, Sammy Sosa, and Todd Stottlemyre. The game has three modes, including single game, season play, and playoffs. There is no home run derby or practice mode. The game has three difficulty settings, three swing types, and four pitch types. The game can be played in a manual mode or an assisted mode. The game includes the General Manager utility, in which baseball players' statistics can be edited, including their weight and height.

== Development and release ==
The game was developed by Microsoft and WizBang! Software Productions. Development of the game began in January 1996, and took 28 months. The baseball players' actions were created through 500 motion-captured moves. Because of its graphics, the game can only be played with a 3D accelerator card. The game was originally scheduled for release in October 1997, but underwent additional development, before being released on July 1, 1998. The game shipped without multiplayer capability, although a patch was in development at the time to allow such a feature through the Internet.

== Reception ==
Reception

Aggregate score
Aggregator	Score
GameRankings	71%

Review scores
Publication	Score
CNET Gamecenter	7/10
Computer Gaming World	3/5
GameRevolution	C−
GameSpot	7.4/10
GameStar	73%
PC Accelerator	3/10
PC Gamer (US)	62%
PC Games (DE)	58%
CNN	C+
Sports Gaming Network	78/100

The game received above-average reviews according to the review aggregation website GameRankings.

The game was praised for its graphics. Scott May of Computer Gaming World praised the animation and considered the graphics to be the best of any computer baseball game to date.

The game was criticized for containing a number of audio and visual glitches. The artificial intelligence (AI) received criticism as well, although a patch was planned to correct this issue. Long load times were another subject of criticism, and the ball physics received a mixed response. Regarding the game's audio, GameSpot's Michael E. Ryan wrote in his early review of the game, "Instead of complementing each other and fitting together to form a realistic game atmosphere, the various sound effects seem to be in constant conflict for your attention." Dan Egger of PC Accelerator similarly criticized the uneven sound effects.

Daniel Morris of CNN considered the gameplay to be mediocre, and Rick Worrell of Sports Gaming Network found it to be the least impressive aspect. Egger criticized the lack of a home run derby, and other reviewers criticized the lack of displayed statistics during season play. The difficulty modes were criticized, being described as either too easy or too hard. Tom Anderson of GameRevolution criticized the assisted mode, stating that "rather than assist you, the AI just takes over, moving your fielder to the ball and making the play all on its own." Ryan wrote that it would have been better if "the computer simply gave you a little help starting the fielders in the right direction, then turned control over to you". During play, the game will sometimes rapidly change its camera angles for visual effect, although this was considered disorienting by some critics, who viewed it as one of the reasons for the game's difficulty. Anderson found the pitching and batting interface difficult to master, and the controls too responsive.

Paul Rosano of Hartford Courant wrote that the game "produced some fine features, but along with most of its competitors, it also falls down in enough other areas to make an unqualified recommendation impossible." May stated that the game's problems "can't be ignored or dismissed. But then again, neither can its considerable strengths." Anderson only recommended the game for "the most dexterous button pushers", although he felt that the game could be worthwhile with fine-tuning in a later release. Worrell called the game a "noble, if ultimately flawed, effort", writing, "This could have been a great title. Unfortunately, there are so many bizarre bugs and inconsistencies. [...] it would take the mother of all patches to fix this game. Barring that, I cannot recommend that you buy it."
