= Terminal Velocity (video game) =

1995 action-oriented spaceship simulation game

- Cover art
- Developer: Terminal Reality
- Publishers: FormGen; 3D Realms (Windows 95 and DOS); MacSoft (Mac OS); Trebuchet Entertainment (Android and iOS); Ziggurat Interactive (Boosted Edition)
- Producer: Tom Hall
- Designers: Mark Randel; Joseph Selinske
- Programmer: Mark Randel
- Composer: Kyle Richards
- Engine: Photex
- Platforms: DOS, Mac OS, Windows 95, Android, iOS, Windows 10
- Release: NA: May 31, 1995; WW: June 2015 (Google Play, App Store, Amazon); WW: March 14, 2023 (Boosted Edition)
- Genre: First-person shooter
- Modes: Single-player, multiplayer

Terminal Velocity is a 1995 shooter video game originally developed by Terminal Reality and published by 3D Realms for MS-DOS and Windows 95, and MacSoft for Mac OS. It is an action flight combat game, with simpler game controls and physics than flight simulators. It is known for its fast, high-energy action sequences, compared to flight simulators of the time.

The game received generally positive reviews. Critics often compared it to Descent and praised its graphics, although some were turned off by what they thought to be the gameplay's lack of depth. Terminal Reality also developed a similar game, Fury3, published that same year by Microsoft. It uses the same game engine and basic game mechanics, but was designed to run natively on the new Windows 95 operating system, leading it to be described as essentially the Windows version of Terminal Velocity.

== Gameplay ==
Terminal Velocity is a combat flight simulator. The player's craft has no inertia, meaning its course can be changed instantly and can fly at low speeds without falling. There are seven different weapons, ranging from guns, blasters and rockets to homing missiles and a rare secret weapon. Additionally, the player's craft possesses powerful afterburners that allow it to move at very high speed, which is useful in order to evade attacks, but sacrifices the ability to return fire temporarily (they can be selected like weapons, and if they are, the fire button will ignite the afterburners). The craft is able to survive some hits, and even some collisions with the terrain, including tunnels.

Each of the 27 missions consists of several objectives, e.g. enemies which must be destroyed, tunnel entrances and exits, mere checkpoints, and an extraction point. At the end of each planet is a boss enemy that must be destroyed before either proceeding to the next planet or completing the episode.

== Plot ==
The story is set in the year 2704, when the Alliance of Space-Faring Alien Races (ASFAR), of which Earth is a member, suddenly turns against Earth and their fleet ravages the planet, starting a war. The player flies a powerful starfighter, the TV-202, in a series of missions to defeat the enemy. In Episode 3, the player learns that a huge supercomputer known as Xenocidic Initiative (X.I.), located on Proxima Seven, is responsible for the war. Their final mission is to eliminate it. A hidden mission can take place after the main plot only in the CD ROM version where the player must investigate a sudden metamorphosis of an unknown nearby planet and destroy the force that changed the face of the planet. It is revealed here that this force drove a man named Sy Wickens into insanity, and how the X.I. Supercomputer had "accidentally" digitized Sy Wickens' persona.

== Development ==
Terminal Velocity (called "Velocity Brawl" during development) was co-produced by Tom Hall. The main programmer of the game was Mark Randel, the former lead programmer of Microsoft Flight Simulator.

== Release ==
The game has three episodes, the first of which was distributed as shareware. Each episode features three different worlds, making a total of nine levels; the only exception is the final planet of Episode 3, Proxima Seven, which has only two stages. Following the release of the shareware version, publisher 3D Realms was inundated with requests that the game be playable with a mouse, leading the company to include a mouse option in the commercial version of the game.

The original floppy disk release was followed by a CD-ROM version. The CD-ROM version added 70 MB of extended pre-rendered 3D cut scenes, a bonus hidden planet, higher image resolution (including more detailed textures) and support for 8-player network multiplay. The Macintosh port was published separately by MacSoft.

In June 2015, to celebrate the game's 20th anniversary, the game's original developer and one of the co-founders of Terminal Reality, Mark Randel, released a version for Android and iOS, published by Trebuchet Entertainment.

A remastered version, subtitled Boosted Edition, was released on March 14, 2023 for Windows, Nintendo Switch, PlayStation 4 and Xbox One. It adds widescreen support, upscaled graphics and extended draw distance.

== Reception ==
Reception

Review scores
Publication	Score
Computer Gaming World	3/5
Computer and Video Games	91%
Edge	8/10
GameSpot	6.9/10
Hyper	92%
Next Generation	2/5
PC Gamer (US)	86%
PC Zone	80%
TouchArcade	3.5/5 (iOS)
MacADDICT	2/4 (MAC)
PC Review	8/10

Terminal Velocity received generally favorable reviews from game critics, who typically compared its gameplay to Descent. GameSpot praised the visuals as immersive and providing a sense of high-speed action, calling the game a "proverbial quick fix" for players seeking a few minutes of fast-paced exhilaration. Edge wrote that the game offered "the most convincing sensation of high-speed, low-level flight yet on the PC", comparing it to Doom and praising its intense action, simple gameplay for a flight simulator, and the eight-player multiplayer mode, which it called "probably the best network game since Doom". Computer Games Strategy Plus summarized the game as "Descent outdoors" and "a little more than a superb facelift of Skyfox". It described the execution as "impeccable", but felt that map exploration was limited by the levels' structure often being point-to-point. PC Gamer, however, argued otherwise, noting that there is no time limit for completing missions.

Computer and Video Games favorably compared Terminal Velocity to Star Wars, praising its "individuality" such as secret tunnels and hidden ships for adding to the polygonal shoot-'em-up's longevity and recommending that the player use a joystick. Hyper particularly lauded the game's graphical engine and soundtrack. It praised its utilization of Gouraud shading and light sourcing effects and the Sound Blaster AWE32 card, and noted that the music is synchronized to the player's current situation. PC Zone wrote that the game's visual quality was nearly comparable to Magic Carpet, and found the CD version of the game to be superior to the floppy disk version. However, it expressed disappointment when the game failed to impress the magazine the same way as Doom, as it found the game to lack originality in its genre. PC Review praised the aspect of the levels' open environment across which the player is free to roam, calling the game "X-Wing in the mountains".

Computer Gaming World also found the game's visuals to approach the quality of Magic Carpet, but felt that the gameplay was repetitive and lacked depth, believing that the developer's made a mistake to make it a simplistic action game to the point where everything is nonstop mayhem. Next Generation, while acknowledging that the game is "fun to play" and has a uniquely wide variety of open locales, gave it an overall negative review. Arguing that the game is a first-person shooter and that "the genre, as currently exploited, is beginning to wear thin", it gave it two out of five stars. MacADDICT praised the multiplayer mode over the Ethernet and AppleTalk networks, but criticized the music and the inability to fire one's weapons and steer simultaneously. It concluded that the game was an acceptable addition to the selection of flight combat games for Macintosh users, which was limited compared to Windows users. TouchArcade wrote that Terminal Velocity was not as memorable as other classics of its time such as Descent, but that the iOS port was a straightforward game well suited for mobile users wishing to experience 1990s' flight simulators.

The game sold 200,000 units.
