= Microsoft Baseball 2001 =

2000 video game

- Developer: Microsoft
- Publisher: Microsoft
- Engine: Baseball Mogul
- Platform: Microsoft Windows
- Release: NA: March 2000
- Genre: Sports (baseball)
- Mode: Single-player

Microsoft Baseball 2001 is a baseball game made for the 2000 Major League Baseball season. It was developed and published by Microsoft, following the earlier games Microsoft Baseball 3D 1998 Edition and Microsoft Baseball 2000.

== Gameplay ==
Microsoft Baseball 2001 uses the Baseball Mogul engine, which requires players to act as general manager of an MLB franchise, forcing players to deal with realistic payroll constraints and city-related issues along the way.

== Development and release ==
Microsoft Baseball 2001 was announced in February 2000. It was developed and published by Microsoft for Windows. It was released in March 2000. The cover art features Boston Red Sox shortstop Nomar Garciaparra.

== Reception ==
Reception

Aggregate score
Aggregator	Score
GameRankings	64%

Review scores
Publication	Score
AllGame	2/5
CNET Gamecenter	5/10
Computer Games Strategy Plus	2.5/5
GameSpot	6/10
GameSpy	78/100
GameZone	7.5/10
IGN	7.9/10
Sports Gaming Network	60/100

Aaron Curtiss, writing for Knight Ridder, praised the game's simplicity but considered it inferior to Sammy Sosa High Heat Baseball 2001. Peter Olafson of GamePro wrote that the game "feels unfinished--more like a step in the right direction than a destination."
