= Muppet Kids =

Sub-franchise of The Muppets

Muppet Kids is a sub-franchise of The Muppets created by Jim Henson, that ran throughout the late 1980s to the 2000s. Like Muppet Babies, the series featured child/pre-teen versions of the Muppets consisting of: Kermit, Miss Piggy, Animal, Gonzo, Fozzie, Bean Bunny, Rowlf, Janice, Skeeter and Scooter.

== Books ==
Muppet Kids initially produced as a children's book series from 1989 to 1996, published by Golden Books and Muppet Press.

== Film ==
In 2002, a direct-to-video feature film Kermit's Swamp Years featured the kid version of Kermit.

== Muppet Kids Reading and Thinking Series ==
Muppet Kids
- Genre: Edutainment
- Developer: Jim Henson Interactive
- Publisher: Brighter Child
- Creators: Voldi Way; Louise Gikow; Diane Mangan; Bonita Ferraro; Lauren Attinello
- Artists: Rob Buchanan; Matt Bozon
- Composers: Mike Hooker; Voldi Way; Ed Neicikowski
- Platforms: Windows, Macintosh
- First release: Letters: Capital & Small; 1997
- Latest release: Sorting & Ordering; 1997

Muppet Kids Reading and Thinking Series is a series of educational video games based on the Muppet Kids series. It was developed by Jim Henson Interactive, published by Brighter Child, and distributed on some CDs by Encore Software. The games were released in the US, the UK, and France. The games were reissued in 2004 and included video clips from The Muppet Show.

=== Games ===
- Volume 1 - Letters: Capital & Small
- Volume 2 - Beginning Sounds: Phonics
- Volume 3 - Sound Patterns: Phonics
- Volume 4 - Thinking Skills
- Volume 5 - Same & Different
- Volume 6 - Sorting & Ordering

=== Releases ===
- In addition to the individual games on separate CDs, the games were also released as compilations of multiple games on single CDs.
  - Muppets (Included in Fun to Learn CD-ROM Five Pack) - Volumes 1 & 2
  - Muppet Kids Reading Skills 1 - Volumes 1 to 3
  - Muppet Kids Reading Skills 2 - Volumes 4 to 6
  - Muppet Kids Kindergarten Deluxe - Volumes 3, 4, & 6
  - Jim Henson's Muppet Kids (Ages 3–5) - Volumes 2 to 5
  - Muppets Reading Software Activity Kit - Volumes 1 to 6

== Others ==
In 1989, McDonald's produced a series of toys for the Happy Meal line-up, which depicted the Muppet Kids riding on tricycles.
