= Mobility (video game) =

MOBILITY
- Developer(s): GLAMUS GmbH
- Publisher(s): GLAMUS GmbH
- Platform(s): Microsoft Windows, Linux
- Release: WIN: 1999; LIN: May 9, 2001
- Genre(s): City-building game
- Mode(s): Single-player

Mobility: A City in Motion is a city-building simulation video game developed by Glamus as an initiative of DaimlerChrysler, with scientific data done by the Bauhaus-Universität Weimar. It is similar to SimCity, in that the game involves successfully developing a town into a larger metropolis; however, the focus is more on the ability of the citizens to use transportation to get around the area (hence the name).

Very fine control of traffic flow is given to the player — details all the way down to speed limits and right-of-way at intersections are options that can be selected in-game. Due to Mobility's focus on getting around, most of the structures that can be built are dedicated to transportation, such as bus stops, parking decks, and train stations, although there are other basic gameplay items such as zones.

== Development ==
Mobility was released for Windows in 1999, according to the updates log in the download page in the game's official German language website. The Linux version was released in May 9, 2001.

The current Microsoft Windows version is 3.02, released on 26 October 2012. The Linux version is still limited to 2.00. It is released as shareware, available on the Mobility web site. The cost of registration varies by country.

== General References ==
- Söbke, Heinrich; Harder, Raimo; Planck-Wiedenbeck, Uwe (2018). "Two Decades of Traffic System Education Using the Simulation Game MOBILITY". Serious Games. Lecture Notes in Computer Science. Vol. 11243. pp. 43–53. doi:10.1007/978-3-030-02762-9_6. ISBN 978-3-030-02761-2.
- Juraschek, Max; Herrmann, Christoph; Thiede, Sebastian (2017). "Utilizing Gaming Technology for Simulation of Urban Production". Procedia CIRP. 61: 469–474. doi:10.1016/j.procir.2016.11.224.
- "MOBILITY - A city in motion". pcworld.pl (in Polish). 24 June 2003.
