= Morning's Wrath =

2005 video game

- Developer: Ethereal Darkness Interactive
- Publisher: Ethereal Darkness Interactive
- Engine: Flare 3.0
- Platform: Microsoft Windows
- Release: October 1, 2005
- Genre: RPG
- Mode: Single player

Morning's Wrath is a 2005 role-playing video game by American studio Ethereal Darkness Interactive.

== Gameplay ==
The gameplay of Morning's Wrath is inspired heavily by Diablo and related games. One important difference is the magic system. Like Diablo, the player can equip one spell at a time. Unlike Diablo, the player designs this spell using 2-12 runes and can store these designs on scrolls within the player's inventory. Different sequences of runes will have different effects and cost different amounts of mana. These runes are acquired by sacrificing artifacts at a special well within the game (the wellspring of mana).

== Plot ==
=== Characters ===
- Princess Morning: Princess Morning is the protagonist of the game and the sole player-controlled character. It turns out that she has inborn magical powers that are related to a wellspring of mana within the castle Iridine.
- Prince Ardus: Princess Morning's fiancé. He betrays Morning and her country at the outset of the game.
- Haliphen: Haliphen is the court wizard who rescues Princess Morning from the Ashidian troops and tells her about the mana wellspring.

=== Story ===
Princess Morning was presiding over a ceremony as heir to her parents' kingdom when a disguised Ashidian messenger arrived. The messenger indicated that her parents, King Daerid and Queen Anoa, have been killed by the Ashidians and that the Ashidians are invading. Prince Ardus has allied with the Ashidians and is using magic to give them access to the interior of Morning's castle. Princess Morning was magically rescued by Haliphen. Haliphen told her that she has magical powers that she can use to fight the Ashidians, but she has to throw items in the wellspring of mana to cure its "taint" and gain additional magical runes.

== Reception ==
Morning's Wrath received mixed reviews from critics upon release. On Metacritic, the game holds a score of 66/100 based on 5 reviews, indicating "mixed or average reviews".
