= Mare Nostrum (video game) =

2008 video game

- Developer(s): Sandstorm Productions
- Engine: Unreal Engine 2.5
- Platform(s): Windows, Linux
- Release: March 1, 2008
- Genre(s): First-person action
- Mode(s): Multiplayer

Mare Nostrum is a multiplayer team-based first-person action video game by American developer Sandstorm Productions, created as a total conversion modification of Red Orchestra: Ostfront 41-45.

The overall aim of the modification is to incorporate the African, Mediterranean and Middle East theatres of World War II as a supplement to the Red Orchestra: Ostfront 41-45 title.

== Gameplay ==
Mare Nostrum game play is similar to its parent game, in that players assume the role of an individual infantryman or tank crew during World War II battles in an online multiplayer environment. Each team then attempts to accomplish objectives varying by game level. Most play revolves around an Attack and Defend style, whereby one team has to take objective areas from the opposing team in order to claim victory.

== History ==
The Mare Nostrum team was formed 8 Aug 2006 with the merger of 2 separate Red Orchestra: Ostfront 41-45 modification teams; Campagna Italiana team and the Burning Sands team.

The Mare Nostrum game project is current subdivided into two phases which reflects the original merger. The first is titled 'Mare Nostrum: Afrikafeldzug 40-43' which concentrates on the actions during the North African Campaign. The second, unreleased, phase is titled 'Mare Nostrum: Campagna Italiana 43-45', and will encompass actions in and around Sicily and main land Italy.

The first public release of the modification was on 1 March 2008. Subsequent additional releases quickly came to address software bugs and gameplay issues with the 1.1 release on 8 March 2008 and 1.2 release on 23 March 2008.

On October 17, 2008, Mare Nostrum was released on Steam. Due to Steam's automatic update feature, version numbers were dropped and all further versions were released exclusively on Steam.

On December 11, 2009 Mare Nostrum received a large content update through Steam which added Steam Achievements, making it the first Red Orchestra mod to do so.

== Reception ==
Mare Nostrum was named as one of the ModDB top 100 unreleased mods during the 2007 event.

Although the 1.2 release was considered a playable product, there were issues building an online player base.
