= Mystery P.I.: The Lottery Ticket =

2007 video game

- Developer(s): SpinTop Games
- Publisher(s): PopCap Games
- Series: Mystery P.I.
- Platform(s): Microsoft Windows
- Release: June 25, 2007; October 16, 2007 (Steam)
- Genre(s): Puzzle
- Mode(s): Single-player

Mystery P.I.: The Lottery Ticket is a hidden object game, created by Canadian studio SpinTop Games. The title is published by PopCap Games. The object of the game is to find a lottery ticket belonging to the player character's grandmother. When it is found, the player character is rewarded with over 400 million dollars in prize money. Before that, the player must find various hidden objects and solve various clues which all relate to the lottery ticket.
