= Hellbender (video game) =

1996 video game

- Developer: Terminal Reality
- Publisher: Microsoft Studios
- Producers: Mark Randel; Joseph Selinske
- Programmer: Mark Randel
- Composer: Kyle Richards
- Platform: Windows 95
- Release: NA: September 25, 1996
- Genre: Simulation
- Modes: Single player, multiplayer

Hellbender is a simulation video game developed by Terminal Reality and published by Microsoft Studios for Windows 95. It is the sequel to Fury3. A demo version of the game was included on later CD-ROM versions of Windows 95.

== Gameplay ==
The player is in control of a prototype spacecraft (the "Hellbender") and must fly it around a map, destroying various targets and reaching checkpoints. The Hellbender has no inertia and thus cannot crash. There are ten weapons available. The Valkyrie and Laser cannons have unlimited ammo, but there are also dumbfire Sledgehammer rockets, homing Viper missiles, and devastating Doomsday mines. Many more weapons are available by collecting power-ups during gameplay.

The levels in Hellbender are composed of a few missions that take place on eight different planets. There are typically three missions per planet.

== Plot ==
Six years after the events depicted in Fury3, the Bions (an alien race created by Terran scientists which rebelled and became ruthless killing machines) kill all the Coalition's qualified pilots on Sebek. The player's character ("the Councilor") is the last surviving pilot for the Coalition of Independent Planets, the defense group that protects the universe from the Bions. The Bions are now targeting the rest of the Coalition's citizens. The pilot must accomplish various objectives on eight different worlds in order to stop the Bions, save the universe, and win the game.

== Development ==
The game was published by Microsoft Game Studios.

== Reception ==
Entertainment Weekly gave the game a B− and compared the game to Wing Commander III, but said that Microsoft seemed to be better at making word processing programs than games.

CNET said "The action is furious as you dive and turn to avoid attackers. Endless explosions will keep your ears ringing. And the sights, both in the air and underground, are intense--especially if you have a 3D accelerator card that supports Direct3D"

The game sold 250,000 units.
