= Magnant (video game) =

2006 video game

- Developer: Mohydine Entertainment
- Platform: Windows
- Release: 2006
- Genre: RTS
- Modes: Single-player, multiplayer

Magnant is an RTS (real-time strategy) game by American studio Mohydine Entertainment which features the military expansion of a colony of ants.

== Card system ==
There is a card system which permits the player to draw cards during the game which can bring diverse bonuses to the colony; to obtain these cards, the player can exchange points gained during matches for 3 copies of one type of card. The player can also trade these cards with other Magnant players at the Magnant official website and also steal or gain 1 copy of a card in the defeated opponent's deck, as well as lose 1 copy of 1 of their own cards after having been defeated.

== Corresponding category ==
Magnant enters properly in the RTS category and is somehow considered as a simulation game which simulates the activity of ants, it is not considered completely a simulation game because it concentrates on too many unrealistic features, such as ants carrying modern weapons (Guns, rifles, grenades) and ants employing siege machinery such as catapults, ballistics, etc.

== Trial version ==
A free trial version of the game has also been released; it features single-player matches, campaigns and runs for up to an hour.
