= CART Precision Racing =

1997 video game

- Developer: Terminal Reality
- Publisher: Microsoft Studios
- Producers: Mark Randel; Greg Seehusen
- Platform: Windows
- Release: NA: December 3, 1997
- Genre: Racing
- Modes: Single-player, multiplayer

CART Precision Racing is a racing video game developed by Terminal Reality and published by Microsoft Studios for Windows.

== Development ==
The game was showcased at E3 1997.

== Reception ==
GameSpot said for the PC, "CART Precision Racing raises the bar for serious racing simulations" and rated the game 8.5. GamePro contradicted that "while Microsoft has done an admirable job with its new CART Precision Racing, it falls short of becoming the new benchmark in racing games." They elaborated that the "quirky controls", confusing array of menu screens, long loading times, and sound card compatibility issues keep the player from feeling fully comfortable while playing the game. They cited the detailed graphics and inclusion of real tracks, drivers, teams, and sponsors as strong points of the game.

Next Generation rated it four stars out of five, and stated that "it's a very fun game and an impressive first effort".

CART Precision Racing tied with Baseball Mogul to win Computer Gaming World's 1997 "Sports Game of the Year" award. The editors wrote: "With state-of-the-art graphics, Internet play, and incredibly deep options that scale the game from novice play through hard-core realism, CART offers the spiffiest high-tech sports thrills of the year".
