= Fury3 =

1995 video game

- Windows 95 CD cover
- Developer: Terminal Reality
- Publisher: Microsoft
- Composer: Kyle Richards
- Engine: Photex
- Platform: Windows
- Release: NA: September 1995
- Genre: Simulation
- Mode: Single-player

Fury3 (stylized as Fury^{3}) is a science fiction simulation video game developed by Terminal Reality and published by Microsoft for Windows 95. It is not a sequel to Terminal Velocity, but the two games share basic game mechanics and use the same engine. Although it was redesigned to run natively under Windows 95, it can run under Windows 3.1 using Win32s. The game was part of Microsoft Home brand.

The game received an unofficial expansion pack, F!Zone, developed by Terminal Reality and distributed by WizardWorks in 1996. Not endorsed by Microsoft, the expansion adds three new planets, nine new missions, and a bundled level editor. A sequel, Hellbender, was released in 1996.

== Gameplay ==
The player controls a pilot of the Terran Council of Peace as they attempt to remove Bion forces from occupied planets, of which there are 8. In each level the player must complete objectives, such as destroying mission-critical targets, whilst navigating towards waypoints that will eventually lead to a 'jump zone' that launches the player's ship to next mission. Mission progression is linear, moving the player through 3 missions on each planet before they are sent to the next. Both aerial and ground-based enemy forces are scattered throughout the mission area to attack the player, and may randomly drop items such as health, boost power or weapon ammunition when destroyed. To combat these enemies the player begins with a default weapon, but can unlock more powerful additions to their armory through pickups. Towards the end of each planet the player must face one or more bosses, known as Guardians; these take numerous gargantuan forms which present a greater challenge to the player, but are combated in the same fashion as regular enemies.

Some of the planets seen in the game bear reference to existing celestial bodies and locations, such as Terran (Earth), Ares (Mars) and New Kroy (an anagram of New York).

== Plot ==
Approximately a decade before Fury3 begins, a large inter-planetary war threatened to destroy the once peaceful world of Terran. In order to defeat their enemy, Terran scientists genetically engineered a race of super soldiers that were to eventually become known as Bions, whose ruthless aggression and power meant that only a small number could fully take over a planet within days. The efforts of the Bions saved Terran, but their bloodlust was all-consuming, turning them on their creators. Towards the end of the war that followed, Terran created an unparalleled military force known as the Council of Peace, which steadfastly wiped out almost all remaining Bion forces. Smaller pockets of Bion troops remained, unbeknownst to the council, and created a Headquarters on the planet Fury, from which they could rebuild and prepare to once more begin their domination of space.

By 2839, the Bion forces had spread to 7 other systems, Terran included. In a hope to quash the Bion threat for the final time, the Council of Peace send one of their pilot Councilors, controlled by the player, to Terran, where the game begins.

== Reception ==
A reviewer for Next Generation panned the game for its excessive similarity to Terminal Velocity, going so far as to call it "a game that's already been released under a different name." He scored it one out of five stars. Hugo Foster of GameSpot agreed that Fury3 is essentially Terminal Velocity for Windows, elaborating that "There are slight changes in the worlds, new Star Wars-type enemies, and varied cockpit perspectives but, in general, Fury3 is not any faster, more colorful or more exciting than Terminal Velocity." However, he found that the blasting action and strong sense of flight made the game worthwhile for those who did not already have Terminal Velocity, and gave it a 7.5 out of 10.

The game sold 600,000 units.
