= GPotato =

Video game website

gPotato
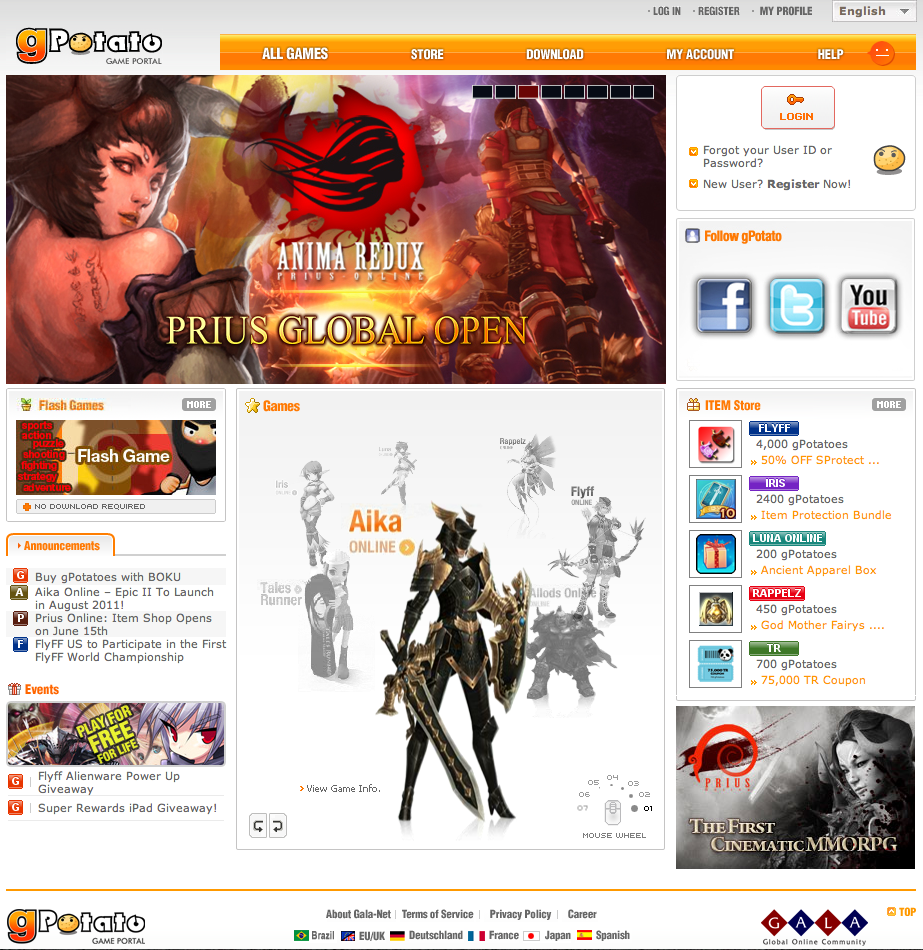
- Screenshot of gPotato.com's 2011 homepage
- Website type: Video game portal
- Available in: 10 languages
- Owner: Gala Inc.
- Website: www.gpotato.jp
- Commercial: Yes
- Registration: Required
- Users: 21 million
- Content license: Copyright

gPotato was a free multiplayer game portal website operated in Japan and South Korea by Gala Inc. and its subsidiaries, and formerly in North America and Europe by subsidiaries of South Korean-based Webzen. gPotato game portals are in South Korea and Japan. Games hosted at gPotato range from traditional MMORPGs to more accessible casual flash games/browser-based games, all of which are free-to-play so no annual/monthly payment is required; revenue is generated from a micropayment system. Games and their premium item shops can be accessed by the Group's regional gPotato portal sites.

gPotato games are aimed at a broad range of players. Gala Inc.'s corporate philosophy is to "connect people all over the world and by doing that, contribute to global peace." With this in mind, the games published on gPotato portals have no blood in them and are appropriate for a wide age group of players.

gPotato in North America and Europe was previously operated by Gala Inc. In February 2013, Gala-Net, Gala Networks Europe and Gala-Net Brazil were acquired by Webzen. In May 2014 the European and North American gPotato Web sites were merged into the Webzen.com portal.

== Serviced Languages ==
Portal	Languages	Company	Established
gPotato.jp	Japanese	Gala Japan Inc.	2006
gPotato.kr	Korean	Gala Lab Corp.	2010

=== gPotato Portals ===
The gPotato portal sites are serviced by Group companies of Gala Inc. in Japan and South Korea.

- gPotato.com and es.gPotato.com launched when Gala-Net Inc. (Sunnyvale, U.S.A.) opened as the North American Group company and online games publisher and launched gPotato.com. The company services the English language market. As of July 2013, Spanish game services have been discontinued. This portal was merged into Webzen.com and closed in May 2014.
- gPotato.eu launched when Gala Networks Europe Ltd. (Dublin, Ireland) was founded by Gala-Net as a wholly owned Group company and online games publisher for the European market after launching gPotato.eu. This portal was merged into Webzen.com and closed in May 2014.
- gPotato.com.br launched when Gala-Net Brazil Ltd. (São Paulo, Brazil) was founded by Gala-Net as a wholly owned Group company to publishes games for the Portuguese language market. The games on this portal were shut down in July 2013.
- gPotato.jp launched when Gala Japan Inc. ガーラジャパン (Tokyo, Japan) was created to publish games in the Japanese market.
- gPotato.kr launched when Gala Lab Corp. (Seoul, South Korea) was created by the 2010 merger of former GALA Group companies Aeonsoft Inc. and nFlavor Corp.

== Community ==
In September 2011, the global gPotato community had over 20 million registered members playing on 18 games globally. As with all free-to-play games or gaming communities, the number of registered users has to be differentiated from:

- Unique users; i.e. the number of persons actually registered as differentiated from the number of accounts (a same user can make several accounts, all counted as a "registered user").
- Active users (users returning regularly).
- Paying users (since all of gPotato's games are F2P, it's possible to play without paying anything).

There are no public numbers for unique, active, or paying users.

== Portal Features ==
gPotato portals have a variety of features. Each gPotato portal is designed and maintained based on the cultural trends where that gPotato portal is serviced so the features vary on each gPotato portal site. In general, the portals offer:

- Profile page
- Achievements
- gPotato balance and fill-up

== gPotato Currency ==
The virtual currency is called gPotatoes. The gPotatoes can be used to obtain virtual game items via a premium item shop. Other users normally would not have access to these items or would have to spend more time in-game to obtain them. gPotatoes can be purchased using credit cards, PayPal, charging through the mobile phone, through gPotato pre-paid cards or through earning free gPotatoes by taking online surveys. Payment methods differ from each gPotato portal based on the regional payment options available.

== Security ==
On July 12, 2007, gPotato suffered a data breach in which more than 2 million users' account details were exposed. At the time of the breach's discovery in 2016, the affected user accounts had since been migrated to the Webzen.com portal. The exposed data included dates of birth, email addresses, genders, IP addresses, names, passwords, physical addresses, security questions and answers, usernames, and website activity.

== Games ==
=== Games Developed ===
Title	Developer	Genre	First Released
Flyff	Gala Lab	Client-based MMO	2005
Street Gears	Gala Lab	Client-based MMO	2007
Rappelz	Gala Lab	Client-based MMO	2006
Eternal Blade	Gala Lab	Client-based MMO	2010

=== Games Formerly Licensed ===
Title	Developer	Genre	First Released
Space Cowboy Online	MasangSoft	Client-based MMO	2006
Canaan Online	XPEC Entertainment	Browser-based MMO	2008
Prius Online	CJ Corporation	Client-based MMO	2008
TalesRunner	Rhaon Entertainment	Client-based MMO	2008
Castle of Heroes	Snail Games	Browser-based MMO	2009
Dragonica	Gravity Games	Side-scrolling MMO	2009
Luna Online	Eya Soft	Client-based MMO	2009
AIKA Online	JoyImpact	Client-based MMO	2010
Vandia Breaker	Namco Bandai	Browser-based MMO	2010
Allods Online	Nival	Client-based MMO	2010
Iris Online	Eya Soft	Client-based MMO	2010
KungFu Hero	9wee	Browser-based MMO	2010
Terra Militaris	Snail Games	Browser-based MMO	2010
Age of Wulin	Snail Games	Client-based MMO	Open Beta July 2013
