= Gala Inc. =

Japanese holding company

- Native name: 株式会社ガーラ
- Company type: Public
- Traded as: TYO: 4777
- Industry: Video games
- Founded: September 3, 1993
- Headquarters: Shibuya, Tokyo, Japan
- Area served: Japan; South Korea
- Key people: Satoru Kikugawa, Group CEO of Gala Inc.
- Products: Flyff; Rappelz; Flyff Legacy; Rappelz M
- Services: gPotato, Mobblo
- Number of employees: 65 (As of August, 2020)
- Subsidiaries: Gala Japan Inc. Gala Lab Corp. (Korea); Gala Mix Inc. (Korea)
- Website: www.gala.jp

Gala Inc. (株式会社ガーラ, Gala Kabushiki gaisha) is a holding company based in Tokyo, Japan, that administers GALA Group, which is made up of subsidiary companies of Gala Inc. The group of companies comprises three types of businesses: MMORPG games, web design, and data mining. Within the group companies Gala Lab Corp. was established in South Korea after the merger of Aeonsoft and n Flavor and develops games for the group's online gaming portal gPotato. GALA Group focuses on developing largely multiplayer online role-playing games. To cover local areas, there are group companies located in the United States, Japan, and South Korea.

GALA Group's games are free-to-play. However, there is a micro-currency system that can be used to buy in-game upgrades. Games and their item shops can be accessed by the Group's regional gPotato portal sites.

== History ==
=== Early years ===
Gala Inc. was founded in September 1993 by Satoru Kikugawa. While at Keio University, Kikugawa was an avid event planner and would rent out clubs in Tokyo's Roppongi district where students could gather. He called these events "Gala". With the expansion of the internet in the early nineties, Kikugawa, inspired by his university events, founded Gala Inc. to bring people together online.

The early business model of Gala Inc. was in homepage creation. One of Gala Inc.'s first website creations was for the All Japan Pro Wrestling site in 1996. The initial business approach was to create home pages free of charge and then share the advertising revenue. Gala Inc. also set up bulletin boards on sites for visitors to share their thoughts. In February 2000, Gala Inc. acquired the company RIS Inc., which was then renamed to Gala Web Inc. While Gala Inc. acts as the headquarters for GALA Group, Gala Web continues to develop websites and systems for clients in Japan. Gala Inc.'s early business model eventually led to Gala's gaming business model, where its games are free, and sales are generated from micropayments.

=== Globalization ===
In November 2005, Gala-Net Inc. opened as a North American subsidiary and online games publisher with its office in Sunnyvale, California. In October 2006, Gala-Net established a wholly owned subsidiary, Gala Networks Europe, based out of Dublin, Ireland.

Also in 2006, South Korean game developers Aeonsoft Inc. and nFlavor Corp. joined GALA Group. Aeonsoft's flagship game was Flyff, while nFlavor brought the Rappelz MMO into the Group. The two game developing companies would later merge to become Gala Lab Corp. in July 2010. In December 2007, another subsidiary was created after Gala Inc. split off its buzz research section to create a new Group company named Gala Buzz Inc. The company offered data mining and information analysis services for corporate clients through its e-mining and buzz reports. Gala Buzz Inc. was sold to Hottolink Inc. in May 2012.

In May 2011, Gala Inc. announced it would enter the smartphone market. The company planned to launch a smartphone social game platform and the development of games for said platform. Gala Pocket Inc. was established to operate the gPumpkin platform and Gala Lab Corp. and third-party developers would develop the games. Gala Inc. also expanded in 2011 by opening a branch office in Seoul, South Korea that was tasked with handling the technical issues across all of GALA Group. In May 2012, that branch was transferred to Gala Lab also located in Seoul.

=== Acquisition ===
In February 2013, Gala-Net, Gala Networks Europe, and Gala-Net Brazil were acquired by Webzen.

The majority of GALA Group's business revolves around MMORPG and smartphone games. Within GALA Group, Gala Web Inc.'s main business was in web design, but this company was sold to Tribeck Strategies, Inc. in 2015.

== Subsidiaries ==
=== Game Publishing ===
The companies publish games by the Gala Lab development teams in Seoul and other third-party developers. The publishing companies in GALA Group are:

- Gala Innovative Inc. (California, U.S.) - was in the mobile games industry doing both publishing and developing, but is currently dormant.
- Gala Japan Inc. ガーラジャパン (Tokyo, Japan) - Gala Japan is the publisher of games in the Japanese market and was established in April 2007. Games localized into Japanese offered through their gPotato.jp portal site are Flyff and Rappelz. In 2015 Gala Pocket Inc., which was involved in smartphone and tablet games, was merged into Gala Japan.
- Gala Lab Corp. (Seoul, South Korea) - Gala Lab was created by the 2010 merger of former GALA Group companies Aeonsoft Inc. and nFlavor Corp. The merged company now publishes games for the Korean market through their gPotato.kr portal site and also develops games for GALA Group as well as third party publishers.
- Gala Connect Inc. (Seoul, South Korea) - Gala Connect was established in October 2014 and is involved in developing smartphone games.
- Gala MIX Inc. (Seoul, South Korea) - Gala MIX was established in September 2015 and is involved in developing smartphone applications.

=== Game Development ===
- Gala Lab Corp. (Seoul, South Korea) - Gala Lab Corp. was created by the 2010 merger of former GALA Group companies Aeonsoft Inc. and nFlavor Corp. Aeonsoft Inc., founded in 2002 in Seoul, developed the game Flyff, meaning "Fly for Fun". nFlavor Corp., founded in 2003 in Seoul, developed the games Rappelz, Street Gears, and IL: Soulbringer.
1. Flyff, or "Fly for Fun", is the first MMORPGs to introduce free roaming flight. Flyff is a party-oriented MMO game where no character can do everything, and efficient play requires working together in groups to level up by defeating monsters. One distinctive feature is its flying system; flying is the normal method of transportation for characters above level 20. The game offers a vast amount of content that is constantly being updated, and it caters to audiences both young and old. In June 2004, the game was awarded the "Best Game of the Year" by South Korea's Ministry of Culture.
2. Rappelz is set in a medieval fantasy world, dominated by three races: the Deva, who represent light, the Asura, who represent darkness, and the Gaia, humans that possess an affinity with nature. Each major installment of the game is referred to as an "Epic". The current installment, which is the second part of Epic VII, is called "Epic VII: Dimensions". The game was also published in Arabic for MENA gamers by the Emirati company Game Power 7. The game was released under a different title known as Hope of Nations (Arabic: أمل الشعوب), and was launched on March 16, 2009.
3. Street Gears is based on a persistent manga-style universe. It is a massively multiplayer roller game where players can challenge each other's in races or trick contests. As for how to use the tricks, it is related to the context and environment of the game. This means that some tricks can only be used while skating on the ground and/or during a jump, while others can be used while in the air, on walls or when there is a barrier that requires bypassing.
4. Eternal Blade is a fantasy/anime MMORPG with a new concept of “Postmodern RPG” and Pioh System where Piohs (pet-type creatures) evolve at three stages that aid the player during the course of the game. The game also has a randomized map system to add to the gameplay variety.

== Game Portal ==
To promote and publish games, GALA Group uses its gPotato game portal. People can play or download games from the gPotato portal for free. gPotato services downloadable client-based games. The gPotato portal launched in November 2005 in the US and 2007 in Europe, and was sold to Webzen in 2013. The gPotato portal and brand is one of the main assets of GALA Group. Currently, gPotato portals are serviced by two subsidiary companies of Gala Inc.

Portal	Languages	Company
gPotato.jp	Japanese	Gala Japan Inc.
gPotato.kr	Korean	Gala Lab Corp.

=== Community ===
As of September 2011, the global gPotato community has over 20 million registered members playing on 18 games globally. As with all free-to-play games or gaming communities, the number of registered users has to be differentiated from:

- Unique users; i.e. the number of persons actually registered as differentiated from the number of accounts (a same user can make several accounts, all counted as a "registered user").
- Active users (users returning regularly).
- Paying users (since all of gPotato's games are F2P, it is possible to play without paying anything).

There are no public numbers for unique, active, or paying users.

=== Portal Features ===
Each gPotato portal is designed and maintained based on the cultural trends where that gPotato portal is serviced so the features vary on each gPotato portal site. In general, the portals offer:

- Profile page
- Achievements
- gPotato balance and fill-up

=== Currency ===
The virtual currency is called gPotatoes. The gPotatoes can be used to obtain virtual game items via a premium item shop. gPotatoes can be purchased using credit cards, PayPal, charging through the mobile phone, through gPotato pre-paid cards or through earning free gPotatoes by taking online surveys. Payment methods differ from each gPotato portal based on the regional payment options available.

== Games ==
=== Games Developed ===
Title	Developer	Genre	First Released
Flyff	Aeonsoft Inc.	Client-based MMO	2003
Rappelz	nFlavor Corp.	Client-based MMO	2006
Eternal Blade	Gala Lab Corp.	Client-based MMO	2010
Masquerade Flyff	Gala Lab Corp.	Client-based MMO	2013
Flyff All Stars	Gala Lab Corp.	Mobile RPG	2014
Flyff Puzmon	Gala Lab Corp.	Mobile match-three puzzle	2014
Flyff Stomp Run	Gala Lab Corp.	Mobile endless running	2014
Flyff Legacy	Gala Lab Corp.	Mobile MMO	2016
Rappelz M	Gala Lab Corp.	Mobile MMO	2020
Flyff Universe	Gala Lab Corp.	Cross-platform MMO	2022

=== Games Formerly Licensed ===
Title	Developer	Genre	First Released
ROSE Online	Triggersoft	Client-based MMO	2005
Canaan Online	XPEC Entertainment	Browser-based MMO	2008
Castle of Heroes	Snail Games	Browser-based MMO	2009
Dragonica	Barunson Interactive	Side-scrolling MMO	2009
AIKA Online	JoyImpact	Client-based MMO	2010
Vandia Breaker	Namco Bandai	Browser-based MMO	2010
Allods Online	Nival	Client-based MMO	2010
KungFu Hero	9wee	Browser-based MMO	2010
Terra Militaris	Snail Games	Browser-based MMO	2010
Age of Wulin	Snail Games	Client-based MMO	2013

== Awards ==
- In 2008, Gala Inc. placed 12th on the Deloitte Technology Fast 50 list for Japan.
- In 2008, Gala Inc. placed 135th on the Deloitte Fast 500 list for the Asia Pacific region.
- In 2009, Gala Inc. placed 24th on the Deloitte Technology Fast 50 list for Japan.
- In 2010, Gala Inc. placed 41st on the Deloitte Technology Fast 50 list for Japan.
- In 2010, GALA Group CEO and Gala Inc. CEO Mr. Satoru Kikugawa was a finalist for the Ernst & Young Entrepreneur of the Year award for the Japan region.

== Insider Trading Incident ==
In 2006, three Gala Inc. employees were directed to pay fines for insider trading when they purchased stock with insider knowledge that Gala had secured a deal with Dentsu. On January 13, 2006, it was announced that the three were the first employees in Japan ordered to pay fines under a new law created by the Financial Services Agency of Japan. Group CEO Mr. Kikugawa issued a public apology regarding the insider trading. Gala also released a statement outlining the changes to their compliance management system and procedures put in place to prevent insider trading from happening again.
