= Luna Online =

2007 massively multiplayer online video game

- Developer: EYA Interactive
- Publishers: KOR: EYA Interactive; THA: Jaya Soft Vision (2008–2016), Asiasoft (2017); NA: gPotato; HKG: GameCyber
- Platform: Microsoft Windows
- Release: KOR: 2007; THA: March 2008; TWN: October 2008; NA: May 14, 2009 (open beta); HKG: June 11, 2009
- Genre: Massively multiplayer online role-playing
- Mode: Multiplayer

Luna Online (Korean: 루나온라인) is a free-to-play massively multiplayer online role-playing video game developed by South Korean studio EYA Interactive. After a three-year development phase, starting in 2004, the game was initially launched in South Korea in 2007, but first became successful with its launch in Taiwan in October 2008.

The game's North American version, which was published by gPotato, received a closed beta that began on April 17, 2009, while an open beta started on May 14. An expansion pack, titled Luna Plus, that includes additional game areas and levels, as well as cosmetic items, was released on January 20, 2011.

== Development and release ==
An advertisement starring Bae Seul-ki was aired. In March 2012, gPotato shut down the servers for the North American versions of Luna Online and Prius Online.

In March 2016, SubaGames launched a Kickstarter campaign to revive the game, ultimately raising C$16,987 to do so. On April 1, the company relaunched the game via Steam, titling it Luna Online: Reborn.

== Reception ==
In a 2008 review, ThisIsGame praised the unique interaction between non-player characters, but criticized the gameplay suffering from repetitive sidequests and poor game balance.

== Sequels ==
On 13 June 2015, Luna: Dalbiccdojeokdan, developed by BH Gamees, was released for Windows. On 24 April 2018, Gamepub released Luna Online M for iOS and Android. On 18 March 2023, Neorigin released Idle Adventure RPG: Lunar: Rebirth. On 14 September 2023, Longtu Korea released Luna Chronicle.
