= Arcane Online =

2016 video game

- Developer: Gala Inc.
- Publisher: Gala Inc.
- Platforms: Android iOS
- Release: August 2016
- Genre: MMORPG

Arcane Online is a free-to-play fantasy MMORPG for Android and iOS, published by Gala Inc.

== History ==
Arcane Online was first released in August 2016 by Japanese game publisher Gala Inc. The game was made available for both Android and iOS platforms.

The game received a large update in January 2017, adding a new archer class. The most recent Android update occurred in February 2019.

== Reception ==
Arcane Online has received a generally positive reception, garnering reviews from Pocket Gamer, Gamezebo, NewsWatch, and Android Community, among others.

Pocket Gamer praised the game for its various fighting and competition modes, large amounts of content, special events, customizable characters, and the large community. They stated that Arcane Online "proves that you don't need to shell out thousands of pounds on hardware to enjoy massively multiplayer gaming" and "has features bursting from its armoured seams, the game throws you into a vast open world of dark fantasy and magic just waiting to be explored." NewsWatch also stated that "If you're looking for a new full-blown MMORPG, then check out Arcane Online . . . MMORPGs are defined by their online community and Arcane Online delivers."

As of March 2019, the game has more than 500,000 downloads on the Google Play Store.
