= MU Legend =

2017 video game

- Official promotional material for MU Legend
- Developer: Webzen Games
- Composer: Jesper Kyd
- Series: Mu Online
- Engine: Unreal Engine 3
- Platform: Microsoft Windows
- Release: March 23, 2017 (Korea); November 7, 2017 (EU, US, SA, SEA)
- Genre: Fantasy
- Modes: Multiplayer online, hack and slash

MU Legend is a massively multiplayer online action role-playing game (MMOARPG). It is based on the 2001 game MU Online as well as MU Origin.

Like its predecessor, MU Legend is developed by the Korean gaming company Webzen Games. The title has been under development for quite some time - first rumors about it appeared in 2004 and its development was held back until 2009. MU2's debut trailer was showcased at the G-Star 2011 Expo in Busan in November. The game is based on Unreal Engine 3 and shares familiar features with Mu Online as distinctive UI and controls. An official Korean site was updated with teaser page in 2015 and MU 2 has been renamed to MU Legend.

== See also ==
- Webzen Games
- Mu Online
