= Rappelz =

2006 video game

- Developer: Gala Lab (formerly nFlavor)
- Publisher: Gala Lab Corp. (English-language release)
- Platform: Windows
- Release: 3 November 2006 (original release)
- Genre: Fantasy MMORPG
- Mode: Multiplayer

Rappelz is a free-to-play massively multiplayer online role-playing game. The game was developed by the Korean company Gala Lab, formerly nFlavor. The English-language version is published by Gala Lab Corp and uses the Play2Bit publishing brand. It was formerly published by Webzen, Inc. until 2020. The game is offered in languages such as English, French, German, Italian, Polish, and Turkish, on their Play2Bit games portal.

As of October 2008, Rappelz was also being published by the South East Asia-based game publishing company AsiaSoft as RappelzSEA but was later dropped by the company on 1 September 2009. The game was also published in Arabic for MENA gamers by the Emirati company Game Power 7. The game was released under a different title known as Hope of Nations (Arabic: أمل الشعوب), and was commercially launched on 16 March 2009. A new version was released on 15 July 2010 by EagleGame in the Philippines, but the PH/SEA version closed in 2016.

As of 6 February 2013, it was confirmed by Rappelz GMs that "Gala Net, Inc. and its subsidiaries Gala Networks Europe and Gala-Net Brazil have been acquired by Webzen, Inc.", however, it is still being developed by Gala Labs and Gala Japan.

Rappelz is set in a medieval fantasy world, dominated by three races: the Deva (who represent light), the Asura (who represent darkness), and the Gaia (humans that possess an affinity with nature).

Major content releases are called "Epics". The official English-language Rappelz website identifies Epic 9.10 and published an update announcement for that Epic on 19 February 2025.

== History ==
The Open Beta version of Rappelz launched on 2 October 2006, with two separate servers available: "Tortus", the normal PvE server, and "Pantera", the more PvP/PK-oriented server. Those who had previously downloaded the Closed Beta version of Rappelz were not required to re-download the Rappelz client to play in Open Beta; however, extensive automatic patching was done by the client before Closed Beta players could enter Open Beta. Closed Beta ended on 26 September 2006. Closed-beta characters were deleted at the beginning of Open Beta; however, characters created during Open Beta were not deleted before the game's release. Open Beta ended with the official release of the game on 3 November 2006, entitled Epic 3 (the previous being Epic 1 and Epic 2: The Epic of the Absolute Creature).

The game has operated official regional servers under several names over time. The official US test server for Epic 4 testing was called "Siren".

== Story ==
The oldest race is the Gaia, and to assist them, the gods of Creation and Extinction brought two more races into the world. They were the Deva who represented the Light, and the Asura who represented the Darkness. With this, there was a period of peace and stability in the world.

As the ages passed by, there was one among the Gaia who called herself "The Witch". Over time, she grew in tremendous power and with a ruthless ambition, rallied the people of Gaia to rebel against the world.

Not all the people of Gaia heeded this call, however, and the world was thrown into chaos. It was only through the combined efforts of the three races of Deva, Asura, and Gaia that "The Witch" was finally captured and burnt alive. It was a victorious outcome of unity between the three races.

The three races continue to co-exist with each other in the world of Rappelz but dark rumors have surfaced about the second coming of "The Witch" and the return of her terrible forces. Epic 6 sets players on a quest to discover who is behind the resurrection of the witch, the introduction of the hero Hector, and later events involving the Witch.

== Gameplay ==
Rappelz features three playable races: the light-aligned Deva, the nature-aligned Gaia, and the darkness-aligned Asura. Each race has three classes: Warrior, magician, and summoner, the class whose abilities center around their pets. Pets are creatures that adventure alongside players, aiding them in battle. Pets and players level up individually, though typically a pet will stop gaining XP if it is at a higher level than its owner.

A Lak is magical energy from monsters and can be obtained by defeating monsters while wearing the appropriate necklace. Gathered Lak can be consumed if the player dies, preventing him from losing experience points, or can be traded at any Lak Trader for either chips or in-game currency, rupees. There were three types of chips. These chips are items that characters can use to significantly affect a battle by increasing the amount of damage the target takes for a limited amount of time. They come in different ranks which allows different levels of users to use chips. Items of equipment have their own level and can level up using upgrading.

Also, combinations of equipment with the appropriate enchantment cubes can further increase its potency, as is the case with weapons, and are reflected graphically through a glow effect. This is called 'enchanting' an item. A weak weapon or armor can be formed into a stronger item without having to sell it and buy a new one. This can also substantially increase both the item's in-game market value. The only non-equipment item that can be enchanted is the skill card.

Items can also be improved by "socketing" Soul Stones. This is done by visiting a Soulcrafter. Soul Stones are dropped items that cannot be bought. When socketed, they will increase one of the primary stats of one's character if certain conditions are met. Soul Power can be charged at the Soulcrafter of each town and will be paid in Lak.

Rappelz also features a Player versus Player (PvP) on/off mode.

=== Classes and levels ===
Rappelz features a variety of classes, most of which can be unlocked through attaining a certain character level and job level. Character levels are attained traditionally, by defeating mobs and gaining experience points. Besides experience points, defeating mobs also grants the player job points. Job points are required to obtain and level up the character's skills, but also to increase their job level. Most skills require a minimum job level to be unlocked. Character progression and level limits have changed across updates.

=== Geography ===
The world of Rappelz consists of a large island, which is the mainland, and a smaller one, which is called Trainee's Island. The mainland is divided into several areas. There are also dungeons to be found, in which monsters are stronger, and experience and job point rewards are higher.

=== Dungeon system ===
Dungeons are isolated places reached through portals. The monsters in dungeons are stronger than normal monsters with the same level, but the experience and job point reward for killing one is also higher. Some items can only be obtained as a dungeon drop. Dungeons are usually entered as a party or dungeon party. This enables the party to efficiently kill monsters and gain experience fast. Parties in Rappelz may contain up to 8 players. Dungeons are not instanced, meaning players will be able to interact with other characters and parties inside the dungeon.

Rappelz has a feature in place that allows guilds to 'own' a dungeon. Ownership of a dungeon brings certain advantages, such as a Lak and rupee 'tax' for characters using the dungeon.

=== Guilds ===
Rappelz features a guild system in which players can form guilds through Guild Official NPCs in major towns. Guilds offer players a group to play with. Up to five guilds can also come together to ally. This was implemented to avoid guild-hopping. An alliance owning a dungeon cannot add any other guild to the alliance.
