= Mu Online =

2001 video game

- Developer: Webzen
- Publishers: KOR: Webzen; EU/NA/SA/AU: Webzen; SEA: Webzen; CHN: ZhaoUC; JP: Webzen Japan; TW: Pinyou Technology
- Director: Kim Nam-joo
- Producer: Lee Soo-young
- Designer: Kim Nam-joo
- Programmers: Song Gil-seop (SaemSong); Sangsu Lee (foguy); Hwang Jun-il (b4nfter); Junseok Ahn (apple)
- Artist: Kim Nam-joo
- Composer: Jeong Jae-hwan
- Platform: Microsoft Windows
- Release: KOR: November 19, 2001; EU/NA/SA/AU: October 13, 2003
- Genre: Massively multiplayer online role-playing
- Mode: Multiplayer

Mu Online (Korean: 뮤 온라인) is a 2001 massively multiplayer online role-playing (MMORPG) video game developed and published by the South Korean company Webzen for Windows.

Mu Online takes place on the mythical continent of Mu, also known as Lemuria, a lost civilization in the Pacific Ocean proposed in the 19th century by writers James Churchward and Augustus Le Plongeon.

Since its commercial launch on 19 November 2001, in South Korea, Mu Online has had twenty-two major expansion packs, known as Seasons.

Mu Online was inspired by the action role-playing game Diablo.

Mu Online theme songs were composed by Jeong Jae-hwan and performed by the Seoul Metropolitan Chorus (Korean: 서울시합창단).

Mu Online became a major critical and commercial success following the release of its international version, Global Mu Online (GMO), on 13 October 2003. Even prior to the GMO launch, the game had already amassed over 360,000 concurrent users across South Korea, China, Taiwan, and Japan. By the end of 2006, it had reached over 56 million registered accounts across all regions.

== Gameplay ==
In Mu Online, players control a character in an open game world from a third-person view to explore the Mu Continent. Players progress by completing quests, interacting with non-player characters (NPCs), and fighting a variety of monsters, ranging from basic goblins to high-level bosses like Gorgon and Kundun. The game primarily focuses on character progression, in which players earn experience points (EXP) to level up their character to make them more powerful, obtain better items by defeating monsters, and buy and sell items using in-game currency Zen, among other game systems.

While the game encourages players to work together to progress, it can also be played solo, without interacting with others. Engaging in player versus player (PvP) combat is an integral part of the game. The game features sixteen unique character classes available for selection.

=== Character classes ===
At the start of the game, players can choose from 16 character classes: Dark Wizard, Dark Knight, Fairy Elf, Magic Gladiator, Dark Lord, Summoner, Rage Fighter, Grow Lancer, Rune Mage, Slayer, Gun Crusher, White Wizard, Mage, Illusion Knight, Alchemist, and Crusader. Each class has its own unique powers and items. As characters level up and complete quests, they can evolve into stronger classes. Each class change grants access to new spells, skills, weapons, and wings, along with a change in appearance.

1st Evolution	2nd Evolution	3rd Evolution	4th Evolution	5th Evolution
Dark Knight	Blade Knight	Blade Master	Dragon Knight	Ignition Knight
Dark Wizard	Soul Master	Grand Master	Soul Wizard	Darkness Wizard
Fairy Elf	Muse Elf	High Elf	Noble Elf	Royal Elf
Magic Gladiator		Duel Master	Magic Knight	Duple Knight
Dark Lord		Lord Emperor	Empire Lord	Force Empire
Summoner	Bloody Summoner	Dimension Master	Dimension Summoner	Endless Summoner
Rage Fighter		Fist Master	Fist Blazer	Bloody Fighter
Grow Lancer		Mirage Lancer	Shining Lancer	Arcane Lancer
Rune Mage	Rune Spell Master	Grand Rune Master	Majestic Rune Wizard	Infinity Rune Wizard
Slayer	Royal Slayer	Master Slayer	Slaughterer	Rogue Slayer
Gun Crusher	Gun Breaker	Master Gun Breaker	Heist Gun Crusher	Magnus Gun Crusher
White Wizard	Light Master	Shine Wizard	Luminous Wizard	Glory Wizard
Mage	Wo Mage	Arch Mage	Mystic Mage	Battle Mage
Illusion Knight	Mirage Knight	Illusion Master	Mystic Knight	Phantom Pain Knight
Alchemist	Alchemic Magician	Alchemic Master	Alchemic Force	Creator
Crusader	Impact Crusader	Master Paladin	Sacred Paladin	Templar Commander

=== Spells and skills ===
Like most MMORPG video games, characters in Mu Online can use many different kinds of skills, spells and buffs. Each character has its own set of spells and skills, and some weapons may be enchanted to provide the character with a specific skill. Casting a skill, spell or buff costs MP (mana or magic points) and sometimes AG (stamina or action gauge).

=== Stat points ===
Characters possess four core statistics: Strength, Agility, Vitality, and Energy. Upon leveling up, most classes receive 5 stat points to distribute. Magic Gladiators and Dark Lords are exceptions, earning 7 stat points per level.

- Strength: Represents a character's physical power. Allocating points into Strength increases physical and melee attack damage while improving hit accuracy. Additionally, higher Strength is required to equip heavier weapons, shields, and armor.
- Agility: Measures a character's dexterity and speed. Investing in Agility increases hit accuracy, attack speed, defense, and evasion (known in-game as Defense Rate). While Strength governs melee damage, Agility dictates damage dealt with Bows and Crossbows. Additionally, Agility is a required stat for various high-tier equipment.
- Vitality: Represents a character's overall toughness and health. Investing in Vitality increases maximum HP (Health Points), allowing characters to withstand heavier damage in combat.
- Energy: Dictates character's capacity for casting spells and using special skills. Classes like Dark Wizards and Energy Elves rely heavily on high Energy to learn advanced spells and boost skill power, whereas Dark Knights utilize it primarily to sustain their weapon skills. Investing in Energy increases maximum Mana, Mana recovery rate, Maximum AG, and overall skill damage.
- Command: A unique stat exclusive to the Dark Lord class that governs their ability to control pets and command allies. Investing in Command allows Dark Lords to acquire new skills (excluding Force, their starting skill, and Fireburst, which scales with Energy).

=== Quests ===
Like most MMORPGs video games, Mu Online features a quest system. Upon completion, players are rewarded with a class upgrade (such as advancing from Dark Knight to Blade Knight), provided they meet the class and level requirements to take on the quest. Even though individual quests are straightforward, progression in Mu Online remains challenging and time-consuming, offering a deep and long-term leveling grind.

=== Maps ===
Mu Online includes a diverse range of maps. Starting locations depend on your chosen class: Noria for Fairy Elves, Elveland for Summoners, and Lorencia for all other classes. Higher-level maps host stronger monsters and enforce minimum level requirements to restrict under-leveled players from entering these maps.

=== Events ===
Several events are scheduled daily, allowing players to compete for unique rewards. Some require entry fees, while others take place in open maps.

Some of the most notorious Mu Online events:

- Blood Castle: Players race to retrieve a divine weapon (sword, staff, or crossbow) and return it to the fallen Archangel.
- Devil Square: Players fight against rapidly spawning waves of monsters; the player with the highest kill count wins the top prize.
- Chaos Castle: A free-for-all survival arena where the last player standing takes victory.
- Castle Siege: The ultimate event. A massive 2-hour war hosted in the Valley of Loren every few weeks. Participating guilds fight for control of the fortress, with friendly fire enabled. The guild holding the castle at the end of the war gains ownership, map bonuses, and server fame until the next siege.
- Invasions: Special boss monsters spawn across different maps every few hours. Prizes are awarded to the player who deals the most damage before the boss dies.

== Expansions ==
Data compiled from the official MU Korea version timeline.

Version	Duration
Season 0	February 12, 2001 – August 17, 2005
Season 1	August 17, 2005 – August 29, 2006
Season 2	August 29, 2006 – December 6, 2007
Season 3	December 6, 2007 – February 26, 2008
Season 3+	February 26, 2008 – August 26, 2008
Season 4	August 26, 2008 – April 2, 2009
Season 4.5	April 2, 2009 – August 27, 2009
Season 5 Part 1	August 27, 2009 – October 27, 2009
Season 5 Part 2	October 27, 2009 – February 4, 2010
Season 5 Part 3	February 4, 2010 – April 27, 2010
Season 5 Part 4	April 27, 2010 – October 7, 2010
Season 6 Part 1	October 7, 2010 – March 3, 2011
Season 6 Part 2	March 3, 2011 – August 25, 2011
Season 6 Part 3	August 25, 2011 – November 21, 2011
eX700	November 21, 2011 – March 29, 2012
eX701	March 29, 2012 – June 13, 2012
eX702	June 13, 2012 – November 27, 2012
Season 8 Part 1	November 27, 2012 – April 16, 2013
Season 8 Part 2	April 16, 2013 – July 30, 2013
Season 8 Part 3	July 30, 2013 – December 10, 2013
Season 9 Part 1	December 10, 2013 – April 22, 2014
Season 9 Part 2	April 22, 2014 – August 19, 2014
Season X Part 1	August 19, 2014 – December 16, 2014
Season X Part 2	December 16, 2014 – May 21, 2015
Season X Part 3	May 21, 2015 – October 21, 2015
Season 11 Part 1-1	October 21, 2015 – November 5, 2015
Season 11 Part 1-2	November 5, 2015 – May 17, 2016
Season 11 Part 2-1	May 17, 2016 – June 9, 2016
Season 11 Part 2-2	June 9, 2016 – November 1, 2016
Season 12 Part 1-1	November 1, 2016 – November 17, 2016
Season 12 Part 1-2	November 17, 2016 – May 23, 2017
Season 12 Part 2	May 23, 2017 – October 24, 2017
Season 13 Part 1-1	October 24, 2017 – November 14, 2017
Season 13 Part 1-2	November 14, 2017 – May 16, 2018
Season 13 Part 2-1	May 16, 2018 – June 7, 2018
Season 13 Part 2-2	June 7, 2018 – October 16, 2018
Season 14 Part 1-1	October 16, 2018 – November 29, 2018
Season 14 Part 1-2	November 29, 2018 – May 21, 2019
Season 14 Part 2-1	May 21, 2019 – June 11, 2019
Season 14 Part 2-2	June 11, 2019 – September 24, 2019
Season 15 Part 1-1	September 24, 2019 – October 17, 2019
Season 15 Part 1-2	October 17, 2019 – November 5, 2019
Season 15 Part 1-3	November 5, 2019 – April 21, 2020
Season 15 Part 2-1	April 21, 2020 – May 11, 2020
Season 15 Part 2-2	May 11, 2020 – September 15, 2020
Season 16 Part 1-1	September 15, 2020 – October 6, 2020
Season 16 Part 1-2	October 6, 2020 – October 27, 2020
Season 16 Part 1-3	October 27, 2020 – April 13, 2021
Season 16 Part 2-1	April 13, 2021 – May 4, 2021
Season 16 Part 2-2	May 4, 2021 – September 28, 2021
Season 17 Part 1-1	September 28, 2021 – October 19, 2021
Season 17 Part 1-2	October 19, 2021 – November 9, 2021
Season 17 Part 1-3	November 9, 2021 – April 19, 2022
Season 17 Part 2-1	April 19, 2022 – May 10, 2022
Season 17 Part 2-2	May 10, 2022 – September 27, 2022
Season 18 Part 1-1	September 27, 2022 – October 20, 2022
Season 18 Part 1-2	October 20, 2022 – November 8, 2022
Season 18 Part 1-3	November 8, 2022 – April 18, 2023
Season 18 Part 2-1	April 18, 2023 – May 18, 2023
Season 18 Part 2-2	May 18, 2023 – September 19, 2023
Season 19 Part 1-1	September 19, 2023 – October 12, 2023
Season 19 Part 1-2	October 12, 2023 – November 1, 2023
Season 19 Part 1-3	November 1, 2023 – April 30, 2024
Season 19 Part 2-1	April 30, 2024 – May 14, 2024
Season 19 Part 2-2	May 14, 2024 – June 4, 2024
Season 19 Part 2-3	June 4, 2024 – September 24, 2024
Season 20 Part 1-1	September 24, 2024 – October 15, 2024
Season 20 Part 1-2	October 15, 2024 – November 5, 2024
Season 20 Part 1-3	November 5, 2024 – April 22, 2025
Season 20 Part 2-1	April 22, 2025 – May 13, 2025
Season 20 Part 2-2	May 13, 2025 – May 29, 2025
Season 20 Part 2-3	May 29, 2025 – September 30, 2025
Season 21 Part 1-1	September 30, 2025 – October 21, 2025
Season 21 Part 1-2	October 21, 2025 – November 11, 2025
Season 21 Part 1-3	November 11, 2025 – April 21, 2026
Season 21 Part 2-1	April 21, 2026 – May 12, 2026
Season 21 Part 2-2	May 12, 2026 – June 9, 2026
Season 21 Part 2-3	June 9, 2026 – September 15, 2026
Season 22 Part 1-1	September 15, 2026 – October 13, 2026
Season 22 Part 1-2	October 13, 2026 – Present

Global Mu Online (GMO), the international version of Mu Online, receives season updates on a delayed schedule compared to MU Korea, though the content itself remains identical.
