= Snail (company) =

Chinese video game company

Suzhou Snail Digital Technology Co., Ltd.
- Industry: Online game development
- Founded: 2000
- Founders: Shi Hai
- Headquarters: Suzhou, Jiangsu, China
- Area served: China
- Key people: Chairman: Shi Hai
- Website: www.snailgamesusa.com

Suzhou Snail Digital Technology Co., Ltd. (Chinese: 蜗牛 苏州蜗牛数字科技股份有限公司; pinyin: Wōniú sūzhōu wōniú shùzì kējì gǔfèn yǒuxiàn gōngsī), doing business as Snail (Chinese: 蜗牛; pinyin: Wōniú), is a Chinese video game company and a virtual network operator headquartered in Suzhou, China, which has branches Snail Games and Snail Mobile. Its division, Snail USA, markets Snail Games products in North America, South America, & Europe. Snail Games products include massively multiplayer online (MMOs), real-time strategy (RTS), and casual games. Its global registered user base has reached over 70 million accounts. The U.S. operation anticipated the launch of its portal for Western audiences in Q2 2011, PlaySnail.com.

== History ==
Snail was founded by Shi Hai in Suzhou, China, and became established as Suzhou Electronic Co., Ltd. in October 2014. The company is one of the first online game developers in China.

== Games ==
Games produced by Snail Games include: Dark and Light (abandoned), Atlas (abandoned), Last Oasis (abandoned), Fear the Night, Voyage Century Online, Heroes of Gaia (Castle of Heroes), Ministry of War (Terra Militaris), Age of Wushu, PixARK, Bellwright, and more.

It is affiliated with Studio Wildcard, the developer of Ark: Survival Evolved.
