= Age of Wushu =

2012 video game

- Developer(s): Snail
- Publisher(s): Snail
- Platform(s): Windows
- Release: CHN: August 8, 2012; NA: April 10, 2013; EU: July 18, 2013
- Genre(s): Massively multiplayer online role-playing
- Mode(s): Multiplayer

Age of Wushu is a free-to-play 3D martial arts action MMORPG, created by independent developers and procured by Chinese company Snail. The game revolves around the wuxia-inspired lore surrounding martial arts and adventures in Ming dynasty China. The European version, Age of Wulin, which had been published by Webzen, closed in July 2017, with players being given the option of transferring to a new European server established as part of Age of Wushu, the version of the game published by Snail USA.

== Gameplay ==
Players initially select one of eight factions, and then develop their characters, learn new skills, and engage in PvE and PvP content. The game does not feature a class system, but allows players to join one of eight player factions, or schools: Shaolin, Wudang, Emei, Beggars' Gang, Tang Clan, Scholars' Academy, Royal Guard and Wanderers' Valley. The only restricted skills are the internal skills of each school. This means if a player leaves their faction, or school, the player loses the ability to use that school's internal skill.

Quests and many other activities, including gathering, crafting and combat, give experience points which are converted into "cultivation" points used to upgrade fighting skills. Elements of the game include solo and party dungeons, an equipment system, crafting and professions, a housing system, and mounts. The attributes of Chivalry and Guilt determine the player's reputation and alignment in the Jianghu System.

=== Combat ===
The in-game combat contains actual martial arts as well as superhuman abilities and elements from Chinese legendary stories such as those depicted in films like Crouching Tiger, Hidden Dragon and Hero. There are no classes or level restrictions. Instead the game uses a skill-based system in which the player has to learn new abilities and talents in order to progress. Combat depends on skill proficiency rather than any assigned numerical value.

There are three types of skills, akin to the Rock paper scissors game: Overt (damage skills), Feint (defense-breaking skills), and Block (blocks incoming damage). There are also assorted skills outside of these categories. Utilizing skills consumes Energy, the equivalent of a Mana pool.

=== Factions ===
Instead of a school, players may instead choose a faction. Factions were released in the Tempest of Strife expansion. Secret Factions: Peach Blossom Island, Shifting Flowers Palace, Rootless Clan Jianghu Factions: Golden Needle Shen Family, Xu Family Village, Beast Villa

== Development ==
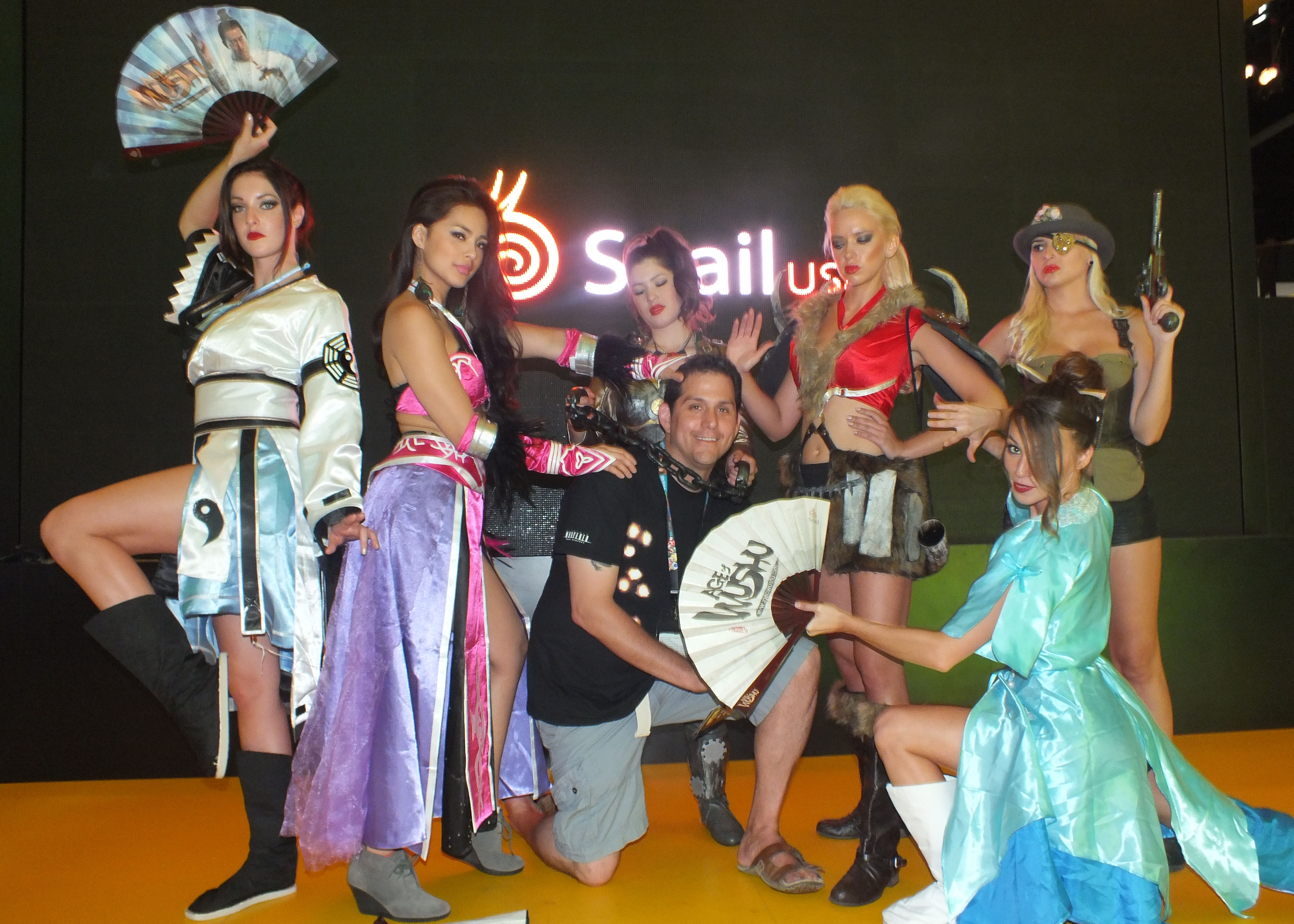
Promotion at E3 2012

The original Chinese version, named 九阴真经 (pinyin: Jiǔyīn Zhēnjīng; lit. 'Nine Scroll Manual'), began beta testing in 2009 and was commercially launched 2012. Over the next few years, the game was launched in more regions with different names: North America (Age of Wushu), Europe (Age of Wulin), Russia (Legends of Kung Fu), Thailand (9Yin) and Southeast Asia (Age Of Kung Fu).

On the 6th of January 2016, the mobile version Age of Wushu Dynasty was launched for both iOS and Android.

Beta testing for Age of Wushu 2 began in 2017.
