= Prius Online =

2010 video game

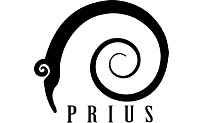
- Developer: CJI
- Publishers: Wasabii; Netmarble
- Platform: Windows PC
- Release: ROK: 2008; PRC: 2009; ROC: January 14, 2010; USA: January 14, 2013; WW: May 1, 2026
- Genres: Free-to-play 3D computer graphics, cinematic, fantasy, MMORPG
- Mode: Multiplayer

Prius Online, also known by its retitled name Arcane Saga, and then again released as Prius Anima, is a free-to-play 3D fantasy massively multiplayer online role-playing game (MMORPG) which revolves around a three character (3C) playing system. The 3C system consists of main character, the Anima, and the Gigas. The Anima is player's character's companion, and the relationship the players develop with her, as they try to unravel the mysteries of her forgotten past, determine her personality and strengthen the bonds that players make. The Gigas, summoned by the Anima in times of battle, are strategic and dynamic mercenaries that fight by player's side. Through this system the game aims to create rich and immersive emotional experiences for the character and the Anima.

Prius Online was originally launched only for Korea in 2008. Launched internationally by gPotato in 2011, the service by gPotato was discontinued in March 2012. The game was discontinued in December 2013 in South Korea. Prius Online was later announced under the name Prius Anima and is an international project. Their opening date is to be determined but expected in the summer of 2026.

== History ==
Prius Online was first launched in 2008, but was only available in Korean.

In the summer of 2011, the game was localized to English and launched internationally, with no regional restrictions.

In September 2013, a Prius private server called Anima was opened.

In April of 2026, a Prius community project was launched to re-open the game permanently, with no regional restrictions and multi-language enabled client.

== Death of Kim Sa-rang ==
On September 24, 2009, Kim Sa-rang, a 3-month-old Korean child, died from malnutrition after both her parents spent hours each day in an internet cafe playing Prius Online in order to farm gold to sell for real money. The couple, 40-year-old Kim Jae-beom, and 25-year-old Kim Yun-jeong, who first met through a chat website, left the child unattended while they went to Internet cafés and only occasionally dropped by to feed Sa-rang powdered milk. In April 2010, the couple were found guilty of negligent homicide and sentenced to two years in prison, with Yun-jeong's sentence being suspended after being pregnant with another child.

The incident was featured in the 2014 Sundance Film Festival-debuted documentary Love Child.
