= Ministry of War (game) =

2010 video game

- Developer(s): Snail Games
- Publisher(s): Snail Games USA
- Platform(s): Adobe Flash
- Release: November 27, 2010
- Genre(s): Strategy MMORTS
- Mode(s): Multiplayer

Ministry of War (Chinese: 帝国文明; pinyin: Dìguó Wénmíng; literally Civilizations of Empires), known in the formerly separate European version as Terra Militaris, is a massively multiplayer online browser-based strategy game developed by Chinese developer Suzhou Snail Electronic Co., Ltd. (Snail Games). It is published in the United States and Europe by its U.S. publishing division, Snail Games USA. It was released on November 27, 2010 in Europe. In 2014 the European game service transferred from Webzen to Snail Games USA.

== Gameplay ==
Players are first asked to choose one of four ancient civilizations to play as. The choice is among the historical nations of Rome, Egypt, Persia and China. Each race has different benefits for a starting player, such as Rome’s units possessing higher than average health, or China’s construction time being shorter than average. Further civilization-specific units are found later in the game, like the Egyptian Anubis Chariot or the Persian War Elephant. After choosing and naming a character, players have the option to take a short tutorial to familiarise themselves with the game. Tasks are appointed to players throughout the game to guide them in learning the game’s mechanics and complexities. Players start with a small army and a high-quality hero to command them.

Players start the game with a tiny settlement in the style of their chosen civilization from the character creation process, but are able to expand their territory, develop their city and build new settlements as the game progresses. Initially, within the starting city, there is only a Town Hall, a Barracks and a Civilian House. Through tutorial quests, players learn how to construct additional buildings, upgrade them, train units for their armies and research skills that will improve various aspects of their empire. Each building has a maximum level of 25, and requires progressively more time and resources to construct. There are five resources in Ministry of War from which construction flows: Food, Lumber, Stone, Metal, and Gold. The player's civilisation will accumulate these automatically within their borders, but their rate can be augmented through research and upgrades.

Heroes are the second main element of the game next to building and upgrading one’s civilization. Heroes act as leaders in the player's empire. They are used to traverse the world map and can be used to plunder, tax and scout other cities. Furthermore, they are used in ranked arena battles and to conquer neutral territories. These heroes, in classic RPG style, can be levelled up through gaining experience points from battle and have an inventory full of slots in which to equip armour, weapons and accessories.

The game features a persistent world. However, there are events that take place in instanced environments such as lair, arena and neutral city battles.

== Combat ==
Combat is central to Ministry of War. Players are required to destroy NPC monsters and armies in order to gain items and experience for their heroes, to raid neutral territories and shrines, and to attack, or defend themselves from, other players. As heroes become more powerful, they are able to increase the size of their standing army and the strength of their troops. Heroes also possess unique skills that can give armies a boost in battle.

Battles can be controlled manually by players, or they can choose to let them play out automatically; victory or defeat is decided upon through AI. A player can join or leave a battle at any point. Once combat begins, there is a brief waiting period during which players have the choice to command the combat themselves or to relinquish control. After this players will have 3 minutes to defeat their enemy. If an army is defeated, units can be retrained in one’s city but heroes themselves never permanently “die”.

== Gameplay goals ==
There are a variety of goals for players to achieve depending on their gameplay style. One player may wish to possess the most territory of any civilization and thus will focus on expanding their influence through temples and worship. Other players may wish to ally themselves with a guild and conquer the most territory and plunder enemy cities. Still other players may wish to pit themselves one-on-one against players in the arena and achieve the highest ranking.

== Guilds ==
Ministry of War requires the participation as a member of a guild to achieve any lasting conquests on the world map. Players joining a guild gain the ability to wage war on neutral territories, build new cities and campsites and campaign against the other civilizations. In the future, guilds will be able to vie for control of “Famous Cities” such as Berlin, Alexandria and Milan.

== Reception ==
- Terra Militaris received a rating of 8.0 out of 10.0 on gaming website OnRPG.com.
