= Dragon Saga =

- Developer: Gravity Interactive
- Publishers: gPotato Europe; GSquare; Nexon; Warpportal
- Engine: Gamebryo
- Platform: Microsoft Windows
- Release: EU: June 10, 2009; NA: October 15, 2009; AS: 2009; Full list, see below
- Genre: Massively multiplayer online role-playing game
- Mode: Multiplayer

Dragon Saga (Korean: 드래곤사가), called Dragonica before 2010, is a free-to-play massively multiplayer online role-playing game developed by Barunson Interactive and Gravity Interactive. Development has been ongoing since March 2006. Operation of Dragon Saga is relegated to different publishers for their respective regions. Whilst being free-to-play, the game also includes a cash shop that allows for unique customization of player's characters. The game's commercial launch was in June 2009 in China and October in Europe and October 2010 in North America. Characters created during the open beta testing were carried over to the commercial release.

Six content expansions for the game have been released, all of which are free: Tales of the Damned which was released on 16 October 2009 and Awakening of the Ice Dragon which was released on 15 February 2011 have both been released in North America.

== Plot ==
Dragon Saga takes place on the continents of El Grego and Angrakka (Elyades and Melanthos in Europe), which had experienced a golden age where humans and dragons were able to live together in peace. These times were not destined to last, and the dragons and humans eventually went to war in what was known as the Dragon Age. Eventually, the dragons were banished to the ancient realm of Aether. The leader of the dragons, Dark Dragon Elga, would continue to mount attacks, but was pushed back when five heroes of legend defeated and trapped him in a prison known as the Shadow Cabinet.

Not even the Shadow Cabinet could hold Elga forever - a thousand years after being trapped, Elga found a method to release his darkness into the world, sending minions to attack the lands in preparation for his arrival.

== Gameplay ==
Players control a character in a three-dimensional plane but the scope of movement is mainly focused on the horizontal axis with limited vertical movement, much like the arcade style side-scrolling classics. In its current state, players can progress through 75 levels in the North American release with the level cap reaching as high as 80 on servers in Asia.

Combat is action-based with moves performed in real-time. All combat is centered around the use of special skill sets on cooldowns. Players can also perform ground and aerial combos by utilizing certain skills in order to render enemies unable to retaliate but can also play the role of a healer or supporter when necessary.

There is also a large number of missions and scenarios for a player to complete co-operatively with others. Each individual dungeon has one to four separate modes for advancement, each increasing in difficulty and not being accessible until the previous instance has been cleared. At the end of every mission sequence is a scenario that advances the player's character to the next stage of the game.

=== Classes ===
At the beginning of the game, players are allowed to choose from one of six basic classes and accumulate levels in order to advance into deeper specialties with more abilities and skills. The six starting classes are warrior, thief, archer, magician, summoner, and twin fighter. Each class has a diverse skill tree in which players may place points into to acquire new skills or enhance ones that have already been obtained. As of February 2011, there are currently a total of four class advancements in the game bringing the total number of playable classes to 28.

=== Tasks ===
Dragon Saga features instances that allow players to gain access to items, experience, and currency as well as serve to advance the overall storyline in the game. These instances are known as "missions" and must be completed sequentially in order to unlock the final scenario that advances the plot. Each step in the mission becomes significantly more difficult than the previous and oftentimes requires a group to complete.

Missions are often composed of four main mission modes (increasing in difficulty) and a fifth scenario (unlocked when the previous modes have been completed). Each step in the mission also features a grading system that attempts to rank players based on how a player has performed during that step. The grading system allows the player to obtain higher quality and quantity loot based on that individual's performance and group contribution.

Players will often be sent into these missions to complete important quests, such as those needed to change class. Although many of these missions can be done by oneself, the benefits of tackling these missions with others far outweigh that of taking them on alone. Players in groups gain bonus experience and with the right group composition, will find it much easier to progress through the game.

== Expansions ==
=== Tales of the Damned (1) ===
Tales of the Damned was published on 16 October 2009 in Europe and November 2010 in North America. Tales of the Damned added a variety of new content and features to the game. This included the addition of a new storyline, controller support and the introduction of pets. The expansion elaborated into the story of the first chapter and as a result two new areas in Dragotaka were also introduced accessible to those who are level 60 or above only; the Van Cliff Dungeon and Drakos' Tower, which served as a fortified tower used to imprison the evil Dragon Lord Elga, until the witch Paris broke in and freed him to cause mayhem across the land. In addition to these new maps, Tales of the Damned also raised the level cap from 60 to 65.

=== Paris Strikes Back (2) ===
Paris Strikes Back was the second expansion to Dragon Saga and was released only in Europe on 23 June 2010. This expansion included the next chapter of the storyline, increased the level cap from 60 to 70 and has other general enhancements such as new weapon and armour sets. Some maps were also given a nice tune-up including the Van Cliff Dungeon and Drakos' Tower, both of which were given the choice of three levels of difficulty. Also, eight new classes were added to the game: Dragoon, Berserker, Sentinel, Bombardier, Joker, Shadow Walker, Cleric and Chaosmage. All the new classes were named by the Dragon Saga forum community but are only accessible after the player hits level 60 and a chain quest is completed.

=== Dragon Saga Kryos Unleashed (Dragon Saga Awakening of the Ice Dragon) (3) ===
Awakening of the Ice Dragon (known as Kryos Unleashed in North America) was the third expansion to Dragon Saga. It was released on 15 February 2011 in Europe and North America. The expansion includes the brand new ice continent of Pagosia in which the third chapter of the story is set. As the name suggests, large portions of Pagosia are entombed in ice, with its frosty appearance enhanced by the spooky spectral creatures that live in its fresh landscape. Seasoned heroes, from level 62 upwards, will find a large quantity of new maps in Pagosia, filled with new sets of both hero and daily quests, providing more than enough challenges for players. The expansion also increased the level cap again, this time to level 75. All the classes introduced in Paris Strikes Back were also made available in the North American version of this expansion.

=== Dragon Saga Elga Unleashed (Dragon Saga New Origin) (4-1) ===
Elga Unleashed (also known as New Origin) is the fourth expansion for Dragon Saga. It was released on 8 June 2011 in the Japanese server, 10 August on the SEA server and 12 September on the European Servers. The expansion includes a new playable race that has 2 new classes. These 2 classes are the summoner and the twin fighter. The fourth chapter to the story is added and as a result the world map has had a complete overhaul due to the influence of chaos in the world of Dragotaka. The level cap has been raised to 80. The second phase of the Elga Unleashed expansion known as Elemental Guardians introduces new content including two new dungeons.

=== Dragon Saga Worlds Collide (4-2) ===
Worlds Collide was a major event for Dragon Saga. It involved an in-game crossover event between Dragon Saga and Ragnarok Online which was exclusive to the WarpPortal North America release. This mini-expansion opens a new series of quests and dungeons with a unique top down camera angle. Costumes, pets, mounts and weapons from Ragnarok Online are available through the quests and merchants near the dungeon entrances.

=== Dragon Saga Galaxia (5) ===
Galaxia is the fifth official expansion for Dragon Saga. It was released in 2013 on the North American worldwide servers. The expansion follows the player as they help Crete save her lover, the god Pios, from the chaos of the corrupted Zodiac. This includes new class abilities, quest lines, 10 new zodiac themed dungeons with 4 difficulty levels, an increased level cap (lvl 85) for players.

=== Dragon Saga Arcadia, Episode 1 (6-1) ===
Arcadia, Episode 1 is the sixth official expansion for Dragon Saga. It was released in 2016 on the North American worldwide servers. This expansion explores new lands and cities of Arcadia, a land of elemental power. Players can discover hidden dungeons and defeat powerful elementals, dragons, and monsters while crafting powerful elemental weapons and armors. This expansion includes new class abilities, quest lines, pets and mounts, costumes and weapons, new socketing systems, and new elemental stat progressions.

=== Dragon Saga Arcadia, Episode 2 (6-2) ===
Arcadia, Episode 2 is the second part of the seventh expansion for Dragon Saga. It was released in 2017 on the North American worldwide servers. This expansion builds on the previous update, with new maps, class balances, events, monsters, dungeons and equipment. Content updates continue on a weekly basis.

=== Dragon Saga Arcadia, Episode 3 (6-3) ===
Arcadia, Episode 3 is the final part of the seventh expansion for Dragon Saga. It was released in 2018 on the North American worldwide servers. This expansion completes the main story line started in the vanilla game, with new maps, class balances, events, monsters, dungeons and equipment. Content updates continue on a weekly basis. The final boss, Destiny Dragon proved to be much too challenging in initial releases and has been reworked in subsequent updates. Along with the expansion came a graphical overhaul of the PVP maps and the Arcadia City region. With Arcadia 3 came a change in the overall tone of the logo, login screen and patcher, reflecting the dark and corrupted nature of the Destiny Dragon.

=== Dragon Saga Evolved (7-1) ===
A large technical update included changes to monster stats, item stats, player skills, and class re-balancing. The update was met with mixed results, positive from "Free to Play users" and negative from "Pay to Win users", abusers and bot users. Part of the update was adding changes to the in-game interface and attack skills to curb the use of automated bot farmers. Much of the update included restored and built upon abandoned skills and weapon stats from earlier expansions.

=== Dragon Saga Kryos Origins (8-1) ===
A time-traveling expansion centered around the rise and aftermath of the dragon Kryos. This was a huge content expansion that included additional dungeons, maps, weapons, armor, items, class balances, new skills, new regions, and new monsters. It also concluded several story elements and questlines that had been previously left unfinished in older expansions.

== Development and release ==
ICE Entertainment released Version 6 of the Chinese Dragonica in open beta on April 24, 2009. IAH's and 8interactive's Dragonica for the SEA-ANZ region have been live since 2009. gPotato Europe's EU English, French and German services began on June 10, 2009, after a closed beta period in the previous month. It has been in full release since the October 2009 release of Tales of the Damned.

THQ*ICE, the former publisher of the North American version, started official service on October 15, 2009. They shut down their service on August 31, 2010, and Gravity Interactive re-launched the North American service in mid-October of that year under the new name Dragon Saga, after purchasing Barunson Interactive, the game's developer.

Nexon, the Korean publishers of the game, shut down the service in 13 July 2011.

== Sequel ==
A mobile version named Dragon Saga for Kakao was released for Android and iOS on 18 April 2024.

As of 2013, all development for Dragon Saga had been done in house by Gravity Interactive. Art, story boarding, 3d modeling and server hosting is all done by a dedicated team. James Ryan Banbury, known as "Tirfing" publicly took over as senior producer, and creative director in 2016.

In August 2022, long time producer, creative director, and livestream personality, James Ryan Banbury (Tirfing), resigned. He spoke about his time as producer and the unique challenges that Dragon Saga had faced during a special farewell Twitch livestream. The livestream was later put up on Gravity's YouTube Channel, but taken down due to various issues in the chat.
