= Heroes of Gaia =

2009 video game

Heroes of Gaia (Castle of Heroes)
- Castle of Heroes logo
- Developer(s): Snail Games
- Publisher(s): Webzen (Europe) , Snail Games (United States)
- Platform(s): (Flash reliant)
- Release: October 22, 2009 (United States) , March 03, 2010-2013 (Europe)
- Genre(s): Fantasy MMORPG
- Mode(s): Multiplayer

Heroes of Gaia (Chinese: 英雄之城; pinyin: Yīngxióng Zhī Chéng), known in the separate European version as Castle of Heroes, is a massively multiplayer online fantasy browser-based strategy game developed by the Chinese developer Snail Games and published in the United States by its U.S. publishing division, Snail Games USA. It is published in Europe by gPotato Europe, through the online game portal of Gala Networks Europe.

== Gameplay ==
Players are first asked to choose a race to play as. The choice is between Human, Elf, Orc and Undead. Each race has different benefits for a starting player, such as humans having an early ranged unit, or early undead units being cheaper to produce than other races. Further racial benefits are found later in the game. After choosing and naming a character players have the option to take a short tutorial to familiarise players with the game. Tasks for the player to complete help to guide the player through the game once the tutorial is complete. Players start with a small but varied complement of troops and a blue quality Hero to command them.

Players start the game with their main castle of the race they chose in character creation, but players have the ability to capture additional castles of the other game races. Initially within the starting castle there is only a Town Hall. Players must construct more buildings in the castle in order to recruit troops and Heroes, learn skills and spells, increase resource storage and defend the castle from attacks. Each building has a maximum level of 10, and requires progressively more time to produce. 5 resources are needed to construct buildings and recruit troops: Gold, Lumber, Ore, Sulphur and Crystal. These will naturally be generated within a castle but can be supplemented by capturing mines to increase generation or looting resources from other players.

Actions made by the player's Heroes require Action Points (AP). Action Points regenerate at a rate of 10% of the player's maximum AP per hour. Players actions, such as recruiting troops, upgrading buildings and combat will earn them Fame, which is used to rank players. Upon reaching the requisite amount of fame, players are granted increases in their maximum AP allocation and a concurrent increase in hourly AP regeneration.

This game is an MMORPG, and a server can have between several hundred and several thousand active players. Like most MMORPGs, Heroes of Gaia is a persistent-state world.

== Combat ==
Combat is central to the gameplay of Heroes of Gaia. Players need to fight NPC monsters in order to gain gear and experience for their Heroes, to capture new castles and mines, and to attack or defend themselves from other players. A Hero is assigned units by the player and sent out to attack monsters, players or objects on the world map. The more powerful the Hero the more of a boost given to the troops being commanded. Heroes can be equipped with items to increase their stats and with spells to use in combat to aid their troops.

Players have the choice to let the AI control a battle or to command the troops personally. A player can join or leave a battle at any point. Once combat begins, there is a 20-second wait to allow players the choice to command the combat or not. After this players will have 3 minutes to defeat their enemy, all players have 4 commands in combat: Attack, Retreat, Focus and Standby. The player can also have the use of any spells that the player has researched and equipped on the combat Hero.

Depending on who or what the player is fighting, their Hero will receive experience as well as possibly earning the player resources or equipment. If their Hero is defeated, it reappears back in its home castle. 60-80% of the units lost in combat will appear in the player's Infirmary (located in the Arena building) and can be revived for a quantity of Gold.

== Gameplay goals ==
Gameplay goals are in some ways dependent on the player. Some players strive to have the highest individual Fame on the server, others try to have the most impressive army or be the one to have defeated the most enemy troops. Other players work to be at the top of the Arena rankings, constantly challenging other players to duels. Some other players work to get a Hero and army strong enough to beat the Babel tower. For a lot of players, the goal is to elevate their guild to prominence in the rankings and control the most Capital Cities.

== Guilds ==
Heroes of Gaia encourages cooperative gameplay in the form of Guilds. Each guild starts out at level one, and rises in level as guild members increase in Fame. Guilds work to take and hold Capital cities and defend them from other guilds. Guild wars are prominent and pride in representing and defending guild mates and guild controlled buildings creates a strong sense of community.

== Babel Tower ==
The Babel Tower is a world building that all players can enter once a day. It was introduced with the expansion Tower of Babel Heroes from roughly level 30 and upward must battle through all 40 levels of the building in order to beat the tower. Each battle fought awards the Hero experience and every 10th level will reward the player a powerful piece of equipment. Each level gets progressively harder with each new level introducing greater numbers and more powerful foes. After each level is beaten a player has the choice to continue to the next level or leave the tower. If a player is defeated any experience or items gained up to that point are lost.

== Reception ==
2009 Heroes of Gaia received the Jing Ling award for being "the best Webgame" in China.
