= Webzen =

South Korean video game company

Webzen, Inc.
- Type: Corporation
- Traded as: KOSDAQ: 069080
- Industry: Game developer and publisher
- Founded: April 28, 2000
- Headquarters: Bundang-gu, Gyeonggi-do, South Korea
- Key people: Kim Tae Young (CEO)
- Products: MU; MU Legend (MU2); S.U.N; Archlord; Metin2; Continent of the Ninth (Seal); Arctic Combat; Reign of Revolution; Archlord 2 ELOA; ASTA
- Website: www.webzen.com

Webzen is a South Korean developer and publisher of video games. The company, together with its subsidiaries, also engages in software licensing and related services worldwide.

== History ==
In September 2008, NHN Games took over Webzen's management. Webzen merged with NHN Games, which was dissolved with the merger on July 7, 2010. Webzen acquired Ymir Games on January 26, 2011 and became the owner of Metin2.

The company's line-up of games includes other new titles such as Archlord 2, MU: eX 700 - MU Online's first expansion, Continent of the Ninth (C9): PvP Global Championship and the first of a kind MU World Championship 2011.

On July 1, 2012, global service of C9 began. With the release of C9, Webzen announced the C9 and Arctic Combat World Championship will start, where players around the world compete to be the best in the games. The finals were held at G-Star 2012 Expo on November 10, 2012.

On December 6, 2012, the global service for Arctic Combat started. The Steam service for Arctic Combat was also included. This service was shut down on September 2, 2013.

In 2025, the company's revenue was 174 billion won, the lowest record since 2017. In 2026, Webzen was sued by Hound13 over publishing rights of an MMORPG DragonSword. Hound13 claimed the company violated their contract over the game.

== Business model ==
Webzen games are free-to-play, but uses a micropayment system to generate revenue. Wcoins are the optional virtual currency that is purchased with real life money in order to purchase virtual goods that are used in Webzen Games.

== Games ==
=== Developed ===
Year	Title	Platform(s)	Publisher(s)	Ref.
2001	Mu Online	Windows	Webzen	

=== Published ===
Year	Title	Platform(s)	Developer(s)	Ref.
2026	DragonSword	iOS, Android, Windows	Hound13	
